The 1919 Birthday Honours were appointments by King George V to various orders and honours to reward and highlight good works by citizens of the British Empire. The appointments were made to celebrate the official birthday of The King, and were published in The London Gazette from 3 June to 12 August. The vast majority of the awards were related to the recently ended War, and were divided by military campaigns. A supplementary list of honours, retroactive to the King's birthday, was released in December 1919.

The massive list contained nearly 10,000 names, more than half of which were appointments to the Order of the British Empire. "The lists of awards to the Army are so long that only a part of the first section can be published to-day," reported The Times on 3 June. "This section fills 131 pages of the London Gazette." Admiral of the Fleet Sir David Beatty and Field Marshal Sir Douglas Haig were both appointed to the Order of Merit. As The Times noted, "The successful leadership of the victorious British Forces by land and sea is happily recognized by the award of the Order of Merit — which is limited in numbers to 24 — to Sir David Beatty and Sir Douglas Haig."

The new peers and baronets were not announced until August.

The recipients of honours are displayed here as they were styled before their new honour, and arranged by honour, with classes (Knight, Knight Grand Cross, etc.) and then divisions (Military, Civil, etc.) as appropriate.

United Kingdom and British Empire

Earl
Sir Edward Cecil Guinness, Viscount Iveagh  Chancellor of Dublin University, 1908.

Baron
Sir Edward Richard Russell  Member of Parliament for Bridgeton Division of Glasgow, 1885–87; First Chairman of Liverpool Reform Club; Editor of the Liverpool Daily Post since 1869. For public services during a long career. By the name, style and title of Baron Russell of Liverpool, of Liverpool in the County Palatine of Lancaster.
Col. William Hall Walker  Member of Parliament for Widnes Division of Lancashire since 1900. Donor of a magnificent gift of Racehorses to the nation in 1916 in order to start a National Stud. For public and parliamentary Services. By the name, style, and title of Baron Wavertree of Delamere in the County of Chester.

Baronetcies
Col. Harry Gilbert Barling  Vice-Chancellor of Birmingham University. For public services. 
Sir John George Blaker. Three times Mayor of Brighton (1895–98); Chief Military representative for Brighton, area. For public and local services. 
John Arthur Brooke  West Riding, Yorkshire, and County Ross. Very prominent and generous in all-religious and charitable movements in the Riding. For public and local services. 
Edward Clitherow Brooksbank  Deputy-Chairman of Quarter Sessions; Vice-Chairman of West Riding County Council; Chairman of Tadcaster Bench. Local Services. 
Coles Child  During the War has been Chairman of West Kent War Pensions Committee, Special Grants Committee, and other War Committees. For public and local services. 
Cecil Herbert Edward Chubb. Presented Stonehenge to the nation, 1918. For public services. 
Captain Douglas Bernard Hall  Justice of the Peace for Sussex; High Sheriff, Sussex, 1907. Started the first Hospital Barge Flotilla in the War, by which over 6,000 wounded were conveyed on rivers and canals in France. For public services. 
Sir Arthur Norman Hill. Chairman of the Port and Transit Executive Committee. Special War Services to the Ministry of Shipping. 
John Henry Holden. Mayor of Leigh for two years. Military representative for whole of Leigh area during the war. For public and local services. 
William Joynson-Hicks  Raised 17th and 23rd Service Battalions, Middlesex Regiment. For public services. 
Lt.-Col. Alexander Leith  Justice of the Peace for County of Northumberland. Food Commissioner for Northumberland and Durham. For public and local services. 
Laurence Richard Philipps  Founder of Paraplegic Hospital in Wales. For public and local services. 
Sir Samuel Roberts  Lord Mayor of Sheffield, 1899-1900. For public and local services. 
Sir Gerald Hemmington Ryan  Justice of the Peace for Norfolk, Suffolk and London; President of Institute of Actuaries (1910–12); Chairman of Reform Club (1916–18). For public and local services. 
Col. Charles Edward Warde  For long continued public services in Kent.

Aide-de-camp
To be personal Aides-de-camp to the King:
Col. His Royal Highness Edward A.C.G.A.P.D., Prince of Wales and Duke of Cornwall  Colonel-in-Chief, 12th Royal Lancers and Royal Scots Fusiliers
Capt. His Royal Highness Prince Albert Frederick Arthur George  Royal Air Force

Knight Bachelor

John Baker  Superintendent of the Broadmoor Lunatic Asylum
Lt.-Col. John George Beharrell  Statistical Authority at the Ministry of Munitions and the Admiralty
Robert Charles Brown  Consulting Medical Officer of Preston Royal Infirmary. Has done much to promote Infant Welfare. Founded Scholarship for Research at Cambridge University. For public and local services. 
Henry Busby Bird  Mayor of Shoreditch. Chairman of Local Appeal Committee and Local Food Committee. For public and local services. 
Isaac Connell, Secretary to the Scottish Chamber of Agriculture
Harry Courthope-Munroe  for valuable services at the Board of Trade
Henry Capel Cure, Commercial Attaché, HM Embassy, Rome
Charles Davidson, Deputy Chairman Establishment Committee, Ministry of Munitions
Alderman George Edmund Davies  Member of several Committees in connection with local affairs, and during the War served as Chairman of National Registration Act (1915) Committee. For Public and local services. 
Walter de Frece, for services rendered at the Ministry of Pensions
Professor William Boyd Dawkins  Honorary Professor of Geology and Palaeontology in Victoria University, Manchester. Geologist on Geological Survey of Great Britain, 1861–69; Curator of the Manchester Museum, 1870; Consulting Geologist in questions of mining and civil engineering from 1870. 
Joseph Duveen. For public services, more particularly in connection with the extension of the Tate Gallery of British Art. 
Alderman Knowles Edge  Justice of the Peace for County of Lancaster since 1904; Mayor of Bolton, 1917-18. For public and local services. 
George Fenwick  Founder and Director of the New Zealand Press Association. For public services. 
Alderman Robert Vaughan Gower  Mayor of Tunbridge Wells, 1917-19. Has done much County work in many capacities. Chairman of Food Control Committee and National Service Representative for East and West Kent during the War. For local services. 
Cuthbert Cartwright Grundy  President, Royal Cambrian Art Society; J.P. for County of Lancaster; Vice-President of Royal West of England Academy, Imperial Arts League, and South Wales Art Society. For public and local services. 
Thomas Henderson  for Roxburghshire; Member of many local Committees during the War. For public and local services. 
John S. Henry, Voluntary Services in the Ministry of National Service
Sydney George Higgins  Assistant Accountant-General, Ministry of Shipping
Charles James Jackson  Well-known antiquarian, Barrister-at-law, author of leading text-books on gold and silver. Has rendered valuable assistance to the Red Cross. 
Leon Levison. Has rendered valuable work in connection with the Russian Jews' Relief Fund. For public services during the War. 
John Young Walker MacAlister  President of Library Association and Secretary of the Royal Society of Medicine. Formed, and acted as Secretary of, the War Office Surgical Advisory Committee. Organised the R.A.M.C. Bureau; Organised an Emergency Surgical Aid Corps for the Admiralty, War Office, and Metropolitan Police. For public services. 
William Maxwell. President of the International Co-operative Alliance and ex-President of the Scottish Co-operative Wholesale Society. For public services. 
John Charles Miles, Solicitor to the Ministry of Labour
Henry Francis New, Mayor of St. Marylebone, 1917-19. Vice-President, Marylebone War Supply Hospital. Chairman of many War Committees. For public and local services. 
Francis George Newbolt  for voluntary services in the Treasury Solicitors Department
Julian Walter Orde, Secretary of the Royal Automobile Club. Has rendered exceptional services in providing for overseas officers during the War. For public services. 
James Wallace Paton  Mayor of Southport, 1908-9. For public services. 
Major John Theodore Prestige. Working partner and Director of Messrs. J. Stone & Co.. Ltd., Engineers, Deptford. Founded 16th Battn. (Deptford) County of London Volunteer Regiment. For local services. 
Lt.-Col. Hugh Arthur Rose  Ex-Chairman of the Edinburgh School Board, Chairman of the new Scottish Educational Authority, Food Commissioner for the East of Scotland
Charles Tamlin Ruthen  Deputy Controller of Accommodation in HM Office of Works
Douglas Shields, Administrator and Surgeon-in-Chief of Hospital at 17, Park Lane, which he gave free of charge for the use of the War Office.
Thomas Sims  Director of Works, Admiralty
Alfred Waldron Smithers  Chairman of the Grand Trunk Railway of Canada. 
Joshua Kelley Waddilove. Prominent Wesleyan leader and philanthropist. For public and local services. 
Francis Watson  for Bradford. Member of Bradford City Council. Military representative, 1915-18. For local services. 
William Henry Wells, Chief Livestock Commission, Ministry of Food
William Ireland de Courcy Wheeler  Member of the Consultative Committee of the War Office. Surgeon to Household of His Excellency the Lord Lieutenant of Ireland. For public services during the War. 
William Howard Winterbotham, Official Solicitor since 1895
Thomas Williams. General Manager, London and North-Western Railway. Member of Canals Committee and Port and Transport Committee. 
Col. Augustus Charles Woolley  Appointed 1908 Honorary Lieutenant-Colonel of 1st Volunteer Battn., Royal Sussex Regiment, which he joined in 1887. For public and local services. 
Henry Arthur Wynne  Chief Crown Solicitor for Ireland

British India
Justice Abdur Rahim, Judge of the High Court of Judicature at Madras
William Allan Ironside, Additional Member, Imperial Legislative Council
Khan Zulfikar Ali Khan  of Maler Kotla, Additional Member of the Imperial Legislative Council
Frank Willington Carter  Additional Member of the Council of His Excellency the Governor of Bengal
Col. Gerald Ponsonby Lenox-Conyngham, Royal Engineers, Superintendent of the Trigonometrical Survey, Dehra Dun, United Provinces
Horace Charles Mules  Chairman of the Karachi Port Trust, Bombay
Alfred Chatterton  Indian Educational Service, retired, Member of the Indian Industrial Commission
James Allan Home, Controller of Munitions, Bombay

The Most Honourable Order of the Bath

Knight Grand Cross of the Order of the Bath (GCB)

Civil Division
Sir Reginald Herbert Brade  Secretary, War Office
Sir Hubert Llewellyn Smith  Secretary, Board of Trade

Knight Commander of the Order of the Bath (KCB)

Military Division

In recognition of services during the War—
Vice-Admiral Ernest Frederic Augustus Gaunt 
Rear-Admiral Sir Richard Fortescue Phillimore 
Maj.-Gen. Sir William Babtie 
Maj.-Gen. Geoffrey Percy Thynne Feilding 
Maj.-Gen. Sir Arthur Lynden Lynden-Bell 

For valuable services rendered in connection with military operations in the Balkans —
Maj.-Gen. Sir William Henry Rycroft 
Maj.-Gen. Maurice Percy Cue Holt 

For valuable services rendered in connection with military operations in Egypt —
Maj.-Gen. George de Symons Barrow 
Maj.-Gen. Arthur Reginald Hoskins 

For valuable services rendered in connection with military operations in France and Flanders —
Maj.-Gen. Hugh Bruce Williams 
Maj.-Gen. Richard Philippe Lee 
Maj.-Gen. Nevill Maskelyne Smyth 
Maj.-Gen. Reginald Walter Ralph Barnes 
Maj.-Gen. Sir Richard Harte Keatinge Butler 
Maj.-Gen. Edward Peter Strickland 
Maj.-Gen. Philip Rynd Robertson 
Maj.-Gen. Henry John Milnes Macandrew 
Maj.-Gen. Cecil Lothian Nicholson 
Maj.-Gen. Cecil Edward Pereira 
Temp Maj.-Gen. Sir Anthony Alfred Bowlby 

Canadian Forces
Maj.-Gen. Frederick Oscar Warren Loomis 

Australian Forces
Maj.-Gen. John Gellibrand 
Maj.-Gen. Thomas William Glasgow 

For valuable services rendered in connection with military operations in Italy —
Maj.-Gen. Sir James Melville Babington

Civil Division

Basil Home Thomson  Assistant Commissioner, Criminal Investigation Department, New Scotland Yard, Director, New Home Intelligence Department
George Evelyn Pemberton Murray  Secretary to the Post Office. 
John Anderson  Secretary, Ministry of Shipping
Norman Fenwick Warren Fisher  Chairman of the Board of Inland Revenue
Aubrey Vere Symonds  For services rendered to the Local Government Board, especially in connection with the Housing Bill
Charles Walker  Accountant-General of the Navy
John James Taylor  Assistant Under-Secretary for Ireland and Clerk to the Irish Privy Council
Stanley Mordaunt Leathes  First Civil Service Commissioner
Herbert James Creedy  Private Secretary, War Office

In recognition of services during the War—
Rear-Admiral John Franklin Parry

Companion of the Order of the Bath (CB)

Military Division

For services rendered in connection with the War —
Maj.-Gen. Walter Howorth Greenly 
Maj.-Gen. Layton John Blenkinsop 
Col. and Hon Brig. Gen. Arthur John William Dowell  late Royal Berkshire Regiment
Col. Henry Edmund Burleigh Leach  late South Wales Borderers
Lt.-Col. and Bt. Col. Arthur Blois Ross Hildebrand  Royal Engineers
Col. James Robert McMinn  late Royal Army Medical Corps
Col. Claude Kyd Morgan  late Royal Army Medical Corps
Maj. and Bt. Col. Malcolm Hammond Edward Welch  Royal Irish Rifles
Lt.-Col. and-Bt. Col. William Henry Bartholomew  Royal Artillery
Lt.-Col. and Bt. Col. Arthur Lisle Ambrose Webb  Royal Army Medical Corps
Lt.-Col. and Bt. Col. Sir Edward Scott Worthington  Royal Army Medical Corps
Maj. and Bt. Lt.-Col. Robert Emile Shepherd Prentice  Highland Light Infantry
Maj. and Bt. Lt.-Col. Richard Knox Walsh  Royal Scots Fusiliers
Engineer Rear-Admiral Charles John James
Paymaster Rear-Admiral William Marcus Charles Beresford Whyte 
Lt.-Col. George James Herbert Mullins, Royal Marine Light Infantry
Capt. Charles Penrose Rushton Coode 
Capt. Alfred Dudley Pickman Rogers Pound 
Capt. Oliver Elles Leggett 
Surgeon Capt. William John Colborne 
Paymaster Capt. George James Clow 
Maj.-Gen. Francis Ventris
Col. Malcolm Sydenham Clarke Campbell  late Royal Artillery
Maj. and Bt. Lt.-Col. William Alexander  Royal Highlanders

In recognition of distinguished services during the War—
Maj.-Gen. John Frederick Andrews Higgins  Royal Artillery
Col. Henry Robert Moore Brooke-Popham  Oxfordshire and Buckinghamshire Light Infantry
Col. Charles Laverock Lambe 
Col. Tom Ince Webb-Bowen  Bedfordshire Regiment
Col. Francis Leycester Festing  Northumberland Fusiliers

Canadian Forces
Col. John Alexander Gunn  Canadian Army Medical Corps
Col. Charles Fenwick Wylde, Canadian Army Medical Corps

For valuable services rendered in connection with military operations in the Balkans —
Col. William Ernest Fairholme  late Royal Artillery

For valuable services rendered in connection with military operations in France and Flanders —

Maj.-Gen. Neill Malcolm 
Col. and Hon Brig. Gen. Robert Kellock Scott  Royal Army Ordnance Corps
Col. Archibald Kennedy Seccombe  late Royal Army Service Corps
Temp Col. William Pasteur  Army Medical Service
Temp Lt.-Col. Sir Smith Hill Child  Royal Field Artillery late Irish Guards
Lt.-Col. and Bt. Col. Charles Edward Corkran  Grenadier Guards
Lt.-Col. and Bt. Col. Hon Walter Patrick Hore-Ruthven, Master of Ruthven  Scots Guards
Maj. and Bt. Col. Archibald Fraser Home  11th Hussars
Col. Stevenson Lyle Cummins  late Royal Army Medical Corps
Col. Robert James Goodall Elkington  late Royal Artillery
Col. Hubert Alaric Bray  late Royal Army Medical Corps
Col. Robert James Blackham  late Royal Army Medical Corps
Lt.-Col. and Bt. Col. James Arbuthnot Tyler  Royal Artillery
Col. John Ambard Bell-Smyth  late Dragoon Guards
Lt.-Col. and Bt. Col. Kempster Kenmure Knapp  Royal Artillery
Lt.-Col. Harold Collinson  Royal Army Medical Corps
Lt.-Col. and Bt. Col. Edwin Francis Delaforce  Royal Artillery
Lt.-Col. Arthur Birtwistle  Royal Field Artillery
Lt.-Col. and Bt. Col. John Spencer Ollivant  Royal Artillery
Temp Lt.-Col. Frank Percy Crozier  New Armies
Maj. and Bt. Col. Alexander Gavin Stevenson  Royal Engineers
Lt.-Col. and Bt. Col. Roger Henry Massie  Royal Artillery
Maj. and Bt. Col. Alexander Walter Frederic Baird  Gordon Highlanders
Lt.-Col. and Bt. Col. William Breck Lesslie  Royal Engineers
Maj. and Bt. Col. John Bartholomew Wroughton  Royal Sussex Regiment
Lt.-Col. and Bt. Col. Leopold Charles Louis Oldfield  Royal Artillery
Lt.-Col. and Bt. Col. Alfred Henry Ollivant  Royal Artillery
Lt.-Col. and Bt. Col. George Standish Gage Crawfurd  Gordon Highlanders
Lt.-Col. and Bt. Col. Stratford Watson Robinson  Royal Artillery
Lt.-Col. and Bt. Col. Harold Fargus  Duke of Cornwall's Light Infantry
Lt.-Col. and Bt. Col. Edward Massy Birch  Royal Artillery
Maj. and Bt. Col. Arthur Henry Marindin  Royal Highlanders
Maj. and Bt. Col. James Walter Sandilands  Cameron Highlanders
Lt.-Col. and Bt. Col. Alphonse Eugène Panet  Royal Engineers
Maj. Richard Mildmay Foot  
Maj. and Bt. Col. Berkeley Vincent  6th Dragoons
Lt.-Col. and Bt. Col. Antony Ernest Wentworth Harman  18th Hussars
Col. Frank George Mathias Rowley  late Middlesex Regiment
Maj. and Bt. Col. Frank William Ramsay  Middlesex Regiment
Lt.-Col. Lawrence Joseph Chapman  Royal Garrison Artillery
Lt.-Col. Cyril Eustace Palmer  Royal Artillery
Lt.-Col. George Birnie Mackenzie  Royal Artillery
Lt.-Col. Philip Wheatley  Royal Artillery
Lt.-Col. Cuthbert Evans  Royal Artillery
Lt.-Col. Percy Morris Robinson  Royal West Kent Regiment
Lt.-Col. Arthur Thackeray Beckwith  Hampshire Regiment
Lt.-Col. Ormonde de l'Épée Winter  Royal Artillery
Lt.-Col. and Bt. Col. Francis James Marshall  Seaforth Highlanders
Maj. and Bt. Lt.-Col. Charles Edensor Heathcote  Yorkshire Light Infantry
Maj. and Bt. Lt.-Col. Alfred Ernest Irvine  Durham Light Infantry
Maj. and Bt. Lt.-Col. Charles Harry Lyon  North Staffordshire Regiment
Temp Lt.-Col. Francis Edward Metcalfe  New Armies.
Capt. and Bt. Col. Hugh Keppel Bethell  7th Hussars
Maj. and Bt. Lt.-Col. Bertie Gordon Clay  7th Dragoon Guards
Maj. and Bt. Lt.-Col. George Edmund Reginald Kenrick  Royal West Surrey Regiment
Maj. and Bt. Lt.-Col. George William St. George Grogan  Worcestershire Regiment
Maj. and Bt. Lt.-Col. Claude-Raul Champion de Crespigny  Grenadier Guards
Maj. and Bt. Col. Henry Cholmondeley Jackson  Bedfordshire Regiment
Maj. and Bt. Lt.-Col. Adrian Carton de Wiart  4th Dragoon Guards
Lt.-Col. Hon Alexander Gore-Arkwright Hore-Ruthven  Welsh Guards
Maj. and Bt. Col. Reginald Seaburne May  Royal Fusiliers
Temp Col. William Taylor 

Canadian Forces
Maj.-Gen. William Bethune Lindsay  Canadian Engineers
Brig. Gen. Herbert Cyril Thacker  Canadian Field Artillery
Brig. Gen. John Fletcher Leopold Embury  Saskatchewan Regiment
Brig. Gen. Edward Hilliam  Nova Scotia Regiment
Brig. Gen. Raymond Brutinel  Canadian Machine Gun Corps

Australian Force
Col. James Campbell Robertson 
Col. William Livingstone Hatchwell Burgess  Australian Field Artillery
Col. Hon Angus McDonnell  Canadian Railway Service
Col. Raymond Lionel Leane
Col. Edward Fowell Martin  
Col. George Walter Barber  Australian Army Medical Corps
Lt.-Col. Herbert William Lloyd  Australian Field Artillery
Lt.-Col. Edmund Alfred Drake-Brockman  16th Battalion, Australian Imperial Force

New Zealand Forces
Lt.-Col. Herbert Ernest Hart  Wellington Regiment
Lt.-Col. Charles William Melvill  NZ Rifle Brigade
Lt.-Col. Robert Young  Canterbury Regiment

South African Forces
Lt.-Col. William Ernest Collins Tanner  2nd SA Infantry

For valuable services rendered in connection with military operations in Italy —
Col. Thomas du Bedat Whaite  late Royal Army Medical Corps
Lt.-Col. and Bt. Col. William Heape Kay  Royal Artillery
Col. John Vincent Forrest  late Royal Army Medical Corps
Lt.-Col. and Bt. Col. Henry Calvert Stanley-Clarke  Royal Artillery
Maj. and Bt. Col. Henry Clifford Rodes Green  King's Royal Rifle Corps
Maj. and Bt. Col. Walter William Pitt-Taylor  Rifles Brig
Lt.-Col. and Bt. Col. Arthur Chopping  Royal Army Medical Corps
Lt.-Col. Ransom Pickard  Royal Army Medical Corps
Maj. and Bt. Lt.-Col. Gerald Carew Sladen  Rifle Brigade
Maj. and Bt. Lt.-Col. Bertram John Lang  Argyll and Sutherland Highlanders
Maj. and Bt. Lt.-Col. Raymond Theodore Pelly  North Lancashire Regiment
Temp Capt. George Lethbridge Colvin 

For valuable services rendered in connection with military operations in Mesopotamia
Col. William Embank  Royal Engineers
Lt.-Col. and Bt. Col. Leslie Cockburn Jones  7th Lancers, Indian Army
Col. Herbert Edward Stockdale  late Royal Artillery
Col. Arthur Forbes  Royal Army Ordnance Corps
Lt.-Col. and Bt. Col. George Mortimer Morris  62nd Punjabis, Indian Army

Civil Division

Robert Russell Scott  Admiralty Establishments
Gilbert Edmund Augustine Grindle  Assistant Under-Secretary of State for the Colonies
Robert John Grote Mayor, Principal Assistant Secretary (Universities), Board of Education
Colville Adrian de Rune Barclay  Counsellor of HM Embassy, Washington
Ernest John Strohmenger, Deputy Accountant-General, Ministry of Shipping
Sydney John Chapman  Senior Assistant Secretary, Gen. Economic Department, Board of Trade
Gilbert Charles Upcott, Principal Clerk, Treasury
John Arthur Corcoran, Assistant Secretary, War Office
John Alfred Ernest Dickinson  Housing Department, Local Government Board
Gerald Arthur Steel, Admiralty
John Reeve Brooke, Assistant Secretary, Ministry of Food
Maj. Anthony Caccia  Secretary to the British Section of the Supreme War Council of Versailles
Robert Welsh Branthwaite  Board of Control
Edward Aremberg Saunderson, Private Secretary to the Lord Lt. of Ireland
David Currie, Director-Gen. of National Salvage, Ministry of Munitions

For services in connection with the War —
Bt. Lt.-Col. Arthur Stanley Redman
Col. Edwin Charles Seaman 
Sir Frank Forbes Adam  Chairman, East Lancashire T.F. Association
Col. William Lambert White  Chairman, East Riding T.F. Association
Col. William Smith Gill  Chairman, Aberdeen City T.F. Association
William Henderson, Chairman, Dundee City T.F. Association
Lt.-Col. Geoffrey Fowell Buxton  Vice-Chairman, Norfolk T.F. Association
Capt. Charles Barrington Balfour, President and Chairman, Berwickshire T.F. Association
Col. Right Hon Lord Richard Frederick Cavendish  Vice-Chairman, West Lancashire T.F. Association
Col. John Edward Mellor  Chairman, Denbigh T.F. Association
Col. St. Clair Oswald  Chairman, Fifeshire T.F. Association
Rear-Admiral Edmund Hyde Smith
Rear-Admiral Sir Arthur John Henniker-Hughan 
Surgeon Rear-Admiral Alexander Gascoigne Wildey
Col. Gunning Morehead Campbell, Royal Marine Artillery
Capt. John Knox Laird 
Capt. Frederick Charles Ulick Vernon Wentworth 
Surgeon Capt. George Trevor Collingwood 
Paymaster Commander Thompson Horatio Millett

The Most Exalted Order of the Star of India

Knight Grand Commander (GCSI)
His Excellency Gen. Sir Charles Carmichael Monro  Commander-in-Chief in India
His Highness Maharao Raja Sir Raghubir Singh Bahadur  of Bundi, Rajputana
George Carmichael  Indian Civil Service, Member of the Council of His Excellency the Governor, Bombay
Michael Ernest Sadler  Chairman of Calcutta University Commission

Knight Commander (KCSI)

For services in, and in connection, with, the military operations in Mesopotamia —
Maj.-Gen. Sir Harry Triscott Brooking 
Maj.-Gen. Sir George Fletcher MacMunn  Inspector-General of Communications

Companion (CSI)

Patrick Robert Cadell  Indian Civil Service, Chief Secretary to the Government of Bombay
Lt.-Col. Montagu William Douglas  Indian Army, Chief Commissioner of the Andamans
Reginald Arthur Mant, Indian Civil Service
Manubhai Nandshankar Mehta, Minister of the Baroda State
Richard Meredith  Chief Engineer, Telegraphs
Col. Charles Mactaggart  Indian Medical Service, Inspector-General of Civil Hospitals, United Provinces
Hugh Lansdown Stephenson  Indian Civil Service, Magistrate and Collector, Bengal
John Perronet Thompson, Indian Civil Service, Chief Secretary to the Government of the Punjab

For services in, and in connection, with, the military operations in Mesopotamia —
Col. Alexander John Henry Swiney  Indian Army
Bt. Col. James Wilton O'Dowda  Royal Dublin Fusiliers
Col. Frederic George Lucas  Indian Army
Bt. Lt.-Col. Arnold Talbot Wilson  Indian Army
Lt.-Col. and Bt. Col. Charles Ernest Graham Norton  7th Hussars

For meritorious services connected with the War —
Lt.-Col. Thomas Wolseley Haig  Political Department, His Britannic Majesty's Consul-Gen., Ispahan
  Counsellor, His Britannic Majesty's Embassy, Tokyo, Japan

Order of Merit (OM)

Admiral of the Fleet Sir David Beatty 
Field Marshal Sir Douglas Haig

The Most Distinguished Order of Saint Michael and Saint George

Knight Grand Cross of the Order of St Michael and St George (GCMG)

Diplomatic Service and Overseas List
Sir Richard Frederick Crawford  Commercial Adviser to His Majesty's Embassy at Washington

Colonies, Protectorates, etc.
Sir Francis Henry May  lately Governor and Commander-in-Chief of the Colony of Hong Kong

For services rendered in connection with the War —
Admiral the Hon Sir Stanley Cecil James Colville 
Admiral Sir Thomas Henry Martyn Jerram 
Gen. Sir William Robert Robertson 

For services rendered in connection with military operations in the Balkans —
Lt.-Gen. Sir George Francis Milne 

For services rendered in connection with military operations in Egypt —
Lt.-Gen. Sir Henry George Chauvel 

For services rendered in connection with military operations in France and Flanders — 
Lt.-Gen. Sir Hubert de la Poer Gough 

For services rendered in connection with military operations in Italy —
Lt.-Gen. Frederick Lambart, Earl of Cavan 

For services rendered in connection with military operations in Mesopotamia —
Lt.-Gen. William Raine Marshall

Knight Commander of the Order of St Michael and St George (KCMG)

Diplomatic Service and Overseas List
John Anthony Cecil Tilley  Chief Clerk of the Foreign Office
Stephen Leech, His Majesty's Envoy Extraordinary and Minister Plenipotentiary at Havana
Robert Follett Synge  Deputy Marshal of the Ceremonies
Ian Zachary Malcolm  Parliamentary Private Secretary to the Secretary of State for Foreign Affairs

Colonies, Protectorates, etc.
Cecil Hunter-Rodwell  Governor and Commander-in-Chief of the Colony of Fiji, and His Majesty's High Commissioner for the Western Pacific
Reginald Edward Stubbs  Governor and Commander-in-Chief designate of the Colony of Hong Kong
The Honourable George Warburton Fuller, Colonial Secretary, State of New South Wales
Sir John Langdon Bonython  for services to the Commonwealth of Australia
The Honourable Sir John McCall  Agent-Gen. in London for the State of Tasmania
Edmond Howard Lacam Gorges  Administrator of German South West Africa

For services rendered in connection with the War —
Maj.-Gen. William Geoffrey Hanson Salmond  Royal Artillery
Admiral Ernest Charles Thomas Troubridge 
Rear-Admiral George Price Webley Hope 
Rear-Admiral Rudolf Walter Bentinck 
Rear-Admiral Charles Martin de Bartolomé 
Maj.-Gen. Philip Geoffrey Twining 
Maj. and Bt. Col. Borlase Elward Wyndham Childs 
Maj.-Gen. Sir Frederick Spencer Robb 
Maj.-Gen. Percy Pollexfen de Blaquiere Radcliffe 
Maj. and Bt. Col. Robert Hutchison  4th Dragoon Guards

Australian Force
Maj.-Gen. Sir Neville Reginald Howse 
Col. Henry Carr Maudsley 

For services rendered in connection with military operations in the Aden Peninsula —
Maj.-Gen. James Marshall Stewart 

For services rendered in connection with military operations in the Balkans —
Maj.-Gen. Hubert Armine Anson Livingstone 
Maj.-Gen. William Henry Onslow 

For services rendered in connection with military operations in Egypt —

Hon Col. Charles Loftus Bates  
Col. Richard Harman Luce  Army Medical Service
Maj.-Gen. John Raynsford Longley 
Maj.-Gen. William George Balfour Western 
Maj.-Gen. Steuart Welwood Hare 
Maj.-Gen. Henry West Hodgson 

For services rendered in connection with military operations in France and Flanders — 
Maj.-Gen. Sir Herbert Edward Watts 
Maj.-Gen. Reginald Ford 
Temp Col. William Tindall Lister 
Temp Maj.-Gen. Cuthbert Sidney Wallace 
Maj.-Gen. Henry Neville Thompson 
Maj.-Gen. Herbert Crofton Campbell Uniacke 
Maj.-Gen. Sir Cameron Deane Shute 
Lt.-Col. Joseph Frederick Laycock  Royal Horse Artillery
Temp Lt.-Col. Brodie Haldane Henderson  Royal Engineers
Maj.-Gen. Reginald Ulick Henry Buckland 
Col. and Hon Maj.-Gen. John Moore 
Lt.-Gen. Sir Henry de Beauvoir De Lisle 
Lt.-Gen. Sir Arthur Edward Aveling Holland 
Maj.-Gen. Sir Robert Dundas Whigham 
Maj.-Gen. Harold Goodeve Ruggles-Brise 
Maj.-Gen. Arnold Frederick Sillem 
Maj.-Gen. William Andrew Liddell 
Maj.-Gen. William Thwaites 
Temp Maj.-Gen. Sir Wilmot Parker Herringham 
Col. Simon Joseph Fraser, Lord Lovat 
Lt.-Col. and Bt. Col. Sydney D'Aguilar Crookshank  Royal Engineers
Temp Lt.-Col. Henry Percy Maybury  Royal Engineers

Canadian Forces
Maj.-Gen. Edward Whipple Bancroft Morrison 
Maj.-Gen. Sir Henry Edward Burstall 

For services rendered in connection with military operations in Italy —
Maj.-Gen. Foster Reuss Newland 
Maj.-Gen. Sir Harold Bridgwood Walker 

For services rendered in connection with military operations in Mesopotamia —
Maj.-Gen. Webb Gillman

Companion of the Order of St Michael and St George (CMG)
Diplomatic Service and Overseas List
Robert Henry Clive, First Secretary at His Majesty's Legation at Stockholm
The Right Honourable the Earl of Drogheda, lately of the Foreign Office
The Lord Kilmarnock, First Secretary at His Majesty's Legation at Copenhagen
Walter James Williamson, Financial Adviser to the Siamese Government
Henry Maclean, Honorary Attaché to His Majesty's Legation at Tehran

Colonies, Protectorates, etc.
The Honourable George Thomas Collins, Member of the Legislative Council, State of Tasmania
Steuart Spencer Davis, Treasurer, German East Africa
Lt.-Col. William Dixon, Royal Marine Artillery, Officer Administering the Government of Saint Helena
Walter Devonshire Ellis, of the Colonial Office
de Symons Montagu George Honey, Resident Commissioner, Swaziland
John William Tyndale McClellan, Provincial Commissioner, East Africa Protectorate
Richard Sims Donkin Rankine, Receiver-General, Fiji
Alfred Allen Simpson, late Mayor of the City of Adelaide, State of South Australia
Frank Braybrook Smith, Secretary, Department of Agriculture, Union of South Africa
Herbert Warington Smyth, Secretary, Department of Mines and Industries, Union of South Africa

For services rendered in connection with the War —
Maj.-Gen. Robert Porter  Ret. pay
Col. Montagu Grant Wilkinson  Ret. pay
Col. William Hely Bowes  Royal Scots Fusiliers
Col. Fiennes Henry Crampton  Royal Artillery
Col. Godfrey Leicester Hibbert  late Royal Lancaster Regiment
Col. George Harvey Nicholson  late Hampshire Regiment
Col. Edward Humphry Bland  late Royal Engineers
Col. Thomas Arthur Hastings Biggs  late Royal Engineers
Col. John William Gascoigne Roy, late Nottinghamshire and Derbyshire Regiment
Lt.-Col. and Bt. Col. William St Colum Bland  Royal Artillery
Col. Burleigh Francis Brownlow Stuart  late Worcestershire Regiment
Lt.-Col. and Bt. Col. William Knapp Tarver  Royal Army Service Corps
Lt.-Col. and Bt. Col. Reginald St. George Gorton, Royal Artillery
Lt.-Col. and Bt. Col. Wilfred Marriott-Dodington, Oxfordshire and Buckinghamshire Light Infantry
Lt.-Col. Sir James Kingston Fowler  Royal Army Medical Corps
Lt.-Col. Andrew Alexander Watson  Royal Army Medical Corps, Special Reserve
Temp Lt.-Col. Percy William George Sargent  Royal Army Medical Corps
Lt.-Col. Alexander Morrison McIntosh  Royal Army Medical Corps
Maj. and Bt. Col. Ivo Lucius Beresford Vesey  Royal West Surrey Regiment
Maj. and Bt. Lt.-Col. Rudolf George Jelf  King's Royal Rifle Corps
Maj. and Bt. Lt.-Col. Charles Graeme Higgins  Oxfordshire and Buckinghamshire Light Infantry
Lt.-Col. Albert George Teeling Cusins, Royal Engineers
Maj. and Bt. Lt.-Col. George Windsor Clive, Coldstream Guards
Maj. and Bt. Lt.-Col. Cecil John Lyons Allanson  6th Gurkha Rifles, Indian Army
Maj. and Bt. Lt.-Col. Hugh Wharton Middleton Watson  King's Royal Rifle Corps
Maj. and Bt. Lt.-Col. Frank Valiant Temple, Royal Marine Light Infantry
Capt. Vernon Harry Stuart Haggard 
Capt. Alan Geoffrey Hotham 
Capt. Charles William Rawson Royds 
Capt. Herbert Arthur Buchanan-Wollaston 
Commander Joseph Man 
Paymaster Commander William Frederick Cullinan 
Paymaster Commander Victor Herbert Thomas Weekes 
Col. Harry Douglas Farquharson, Royal Marine Light Infantry
Lt.-Col. John Bruce Finlaison, Royal Marine Light Infantry
Maj. and Bt. Lt.-Col. Hugh Ferguson Montgomery, Royal Marine Light Infantry 
Maj. Joseph Arthur Myles Ariel Clark, Royal Marine Light Infantry
Col. John Miles Steel 
Col. Edward Alexander Dimsdale Masterman 
Col. Henry Percy Smyth-Osbourne
Col. Frederick Crosby Halahan 
Col. Percy Robert Clifford Groves  Shropshire Light Infantry
Lt.-Col. Roland Cecil Sneyd Hunt
Lt.-Col. Charles Rumney Samson 
Lt.-Col. Edgar Rainey Ludlow-Hewitt  Royal Irish Rifles
Lt.-Col. Ulick John Deane Bourke, Oxfordshire and Buckinghamshire Light Infantry
Lt.-Col. Amyas Eden Borton  Royal Highlanders
Lt.-Col. Albert Fletcher  Royal Engineers
Lt.-Col. Alfred Drummond Warrington-Morris 
Lt.-Col. John Archibald Houison-Craufurd  Indian Army
Maj. John Adrian Chamier  Ind Army
Lt.-Col. Arthur Sheridan Barratt  Royal Artillery
Lt.-Col. Cecil Fraser  North Staffordshire Regiment
Maj. Robert Anstruther Bradley, North Staffordshire Regiment
Maj. and Bt. Lt.-Col. Edwin Henry Ethelbert Collen  
Lt.-Col. Samuel McDonald  Gordon Highlanders

Canadian Forces
Temp Col. Bernard Maynard Humble  Canadian Railway Troops
Lt.-Col. George Gow, Canadian Army Dent. Corps
Lt.-Col. Allan Coats Rankin, Canadian Army Medical Corps
Lt.-Col. William Thorns Morris Mackinnon, Canadian Army Medical Corps
Lt.-Col. Frederick Charles Bell, Canadian Army Medical Corps
Lt.-Col. Ervin Lockwood Stone, Canadian Army Medical Corps
Lt.-Col. Edgar William Pope, Nova Scotia Regiment
Lt.-Col. Thomas Gibson  Quebec Regiment
Lt.-Col. George Hamilton Cassels, Central Ontario Regiment

Australian Forces
Lt.-Col. Robert Edward Jackson  Australia Imperial Force
Lt.-Col. John Hubback Anderson  Australia Army Medical Corps

New Zealand Forces
Lt.-Col. George Cruickshanks Griffiths, Canterbury Regiment

For services rendered in connection with military operations in the Balkans —
Col. John Kelso Tod, Indian Army
Maj. and Bt. Col. William Montgomery Thomson  Seaforth Highlanders
Temp Col. Hildred Edward Webb Bowen  Royal Engineers
Lt.-Col. and Bt. Col. Thomas Bruce  Royal Artillery
Lt.-Col. and Bt. Col. Philip Lancelot Holbrooke  Royal Artillery
Lt.-Col. Guy Archibald Hastings Beatty  Indian Army
Maj. and Bt. Lt.-Col. Verney Asser  Royal Artillery
Maj. and Bt. Lt.-Col. William James Norman Cooke-Collis  Royal Irish Rifles
Lt.-Col. George Hamilton Gordon  Royal Field Artillery
Maj. and Bt. Lt.-Col. Harold Charles Webster Hale Wortham  Royal Irish Fusiliers
Lt.-Col. Archibald Ogilvie Lyttelton Kindersley, Highland Light Infantry, Special Reserve
Maj. and Bt. Lt.-Col. Charles Walter Holden  Royal Army Medical Corps
Maj. and Bt. Lt.-Col. Thomas Gayer Gayer-Anderson  Royal Artillery
Maj. and Bt. Lt.-Col. Robert Stewart Popham  Nottinghamshire and Derbyshire Regiment
Maj. and Bt. Lt.-Col. Peter George Fry  Wessex Field Company, Royal Engineers
Maj. Joseph Ward  Royal Army Medical Corps

For services rendered in connection with military operations in France and Flanders —
Maj.-Gen. John Joseph Gerrard 
Maj.-Gen. James Thomson  Army Medical Service
Maj.-Gen. Ewen George Sinclair-Maclagan 
Col. and Brig. Gen. Herbert Conyers Surtees 
Col. Henry O'Donnell, late West Yorkshire Regiment
Maj. and Bt. Col. Arthur Crawford Daly  West Yorkshire Regiment
Maj. and Bt. Col. James Ronald Edmondston Charles  Royal Engineers
Col. Stafford Charles Babington  Royal Engineers
Lt.-Col. and Bt. Col. Arbuthnott James Hughes, ret.
Lt.-Col. and Bt. Col. George Sidney Clive  Grenadier Guards
Maj. and Bt. Col. Eric Stanley Girdwood  Scottish Rifles
Lt.-Col. and Bt. Col. Herbert Spencer Seligman  Royal Artillery
Maj. and Bt. Col. Charles Bonham-Carter  Royal West Kent Regiment
Lt.-Col. and Bt. Col. Charles Walker Scott  Royal Artillery
Lt.-Col. and Bt. Col. Frederick William Henry Walshe  Royal Artillery
Maj. and Bt. Col. Cuthbert Graham Fuller  Royal Engineers
Maj. and Bt. Col. Roland Henry Mangles  Royal West Surrey Regiment
Lt.-Col. and Bt. Col. John Eric Christian Livingstone-Learmonth  Royal Artillery
Maj. and Bt. Col. Alfred Edgar Glasgow  Royal Sussex Regiment
Capt. and Bt. Col. Robert O'Hara Livesay  Royal West Surrey Regiment
Maj. and Bt. Col. Ernest Vere Turner  Royal Engineers
Capt. and Bt. Col. Hon Anthony Morton Henley  5th Lancers
Lt.-Col. Sir Edward Henry St. Lawrence Clarke  Ret., West Yorkshire Regiment
Lt.-Col. William Thorburn  Royal Army Medical Corps
Lt.-Col. Seymour Gilbert Barling  Royal Army Medical Corps
Lt.-Col. William Thomas Brownlow, Marquess of Exeter, Royal Field Artillery
Lt.-Col. Hugh Edwardes, Lord Kensington  Welsh Horse Yeomanry, attd. Royal Welsh Fusiliers
Lt.-Col. Edward William Home  Seaforth Highlanders and Labour Corps
Lt.-Col. Cecil John Herbert Spence-Jones  Pembroke Yeomanry, attd. Welsh Regiment
Lt.-Col. Gerald Trevor Bruce  Glamorgan Yeomanry, attd. Lincolnshire Regiment
Temp Lt.-Col. Firederick Alfred Dixon  Royal Artillery
Lt.-Col. Arthur Robert Liddell  Royal Army Service Corps
Lt.-Col. Robert Richmond Raymeir  South Wales Borderers
Temp Lt.-Col. Charles Carlyle MacDowell  Royal Artillery
Lt.-Col. Duncan Gus Baillie  Lovat's Scouts and Cameron Highlanders
Lt.-Col. Edwin Charles Montgomery Smith  Royal Army Medical Corps
Lt.-Col. Reginald Edgar Sugden  West Riding Regiment
Lt.-Col. Abraham England  Royal Army Service Corps
Temp Lt.-Col. Robert Kyle  Highland Light Infantry
Temp Lt.-Col. William Richard Goodwin  Royal Irish Rifles
Temp Lt.-Col. Bertram James Walker  Royal Sussex Regiment
Temp Lt.-Col. James George Kirkwood  King's Royal Rifle Corps
Temp Lt.-Col. Albert Edward Scothera  Nottinghamshire and Derbyshire Regiment
Lt.-Col. Jacob Waley Cohen  London Regiment
Lt.-Col. Walter Francis Lucy  Royal Field Artillery
Temp Lt.-Col. Claude Gordon Douglas 
Temp Lt.-Col. Gerald Louis Johnson Tuck  Suffolk Regiment
Lt.-Col. Francis Garven Dillon Johnston  Royal Artillery
Temp Lt.-Col. John Hugh Chevalier Peirs  Royal West Surrey Regiment
Temp Lt.-Col. George Rollo  New Armies
Lt.-Col. Walter Howel-Jones  Royal Artillery
Lt.-Col. Edward Walter Comyn  Royal Artillery
Lt.-Col. Edward Ivan de Sausmarez Thorpe  Bedfordshire Regiment
Lt.-Col. Bertie Coore Dent  Leicestershire Regiment
Maj. and Bt. Lt.-Col. William-Frederick Sweny  Royal Fusiliers
Maj. and Bt. Lt.-Col. John Harington  Rifle Brigade
Lt.-Col. Richard Walter St. Lawrence Gethin  Royal Artillery
Lt.-Col. Tom Ogle Seagram  Royal Artillery
Lt.-Col. Arthur Hugh Thorp  Royal Artillery
Lt.-Col. James Donnelly Sherer  Royal Artillery
Bt. Col. Alfred Burt  3rd Dragoon Guards
Lt.-Col. Edward Vaughan  Manchester Regiment
Lt.-Col. Harry Ward  Royal Artillery
Maj. and Bt. Lt.-Col. Carlos Joseph Hickie, Royal Fusiliers
Maj. and Bt. Lt.-Col. Basil Wilfred Bowdler Bowdler  Royal Engineers
Maj. and, Bt. Lt.-Col. Frank Augustin Kinder White  Royal Engineers
Maj. and Bt. Lt.-Col. Alan Gordon Haig  Royal Artillery
Maj. and Bt. Lt.-Col. Eric FitzGerald Dillon  Royal Munster Fusiliers
Maj. and Bt. Lt.-Col. George Archibald Stevens  Royal Fusiliers
Maj. and Bt. Lt.-Col. Reginald Graham Clarke  Royal West Surrey Regiment and Machine Gun Corps
Maj. and Bt. Lt.-Col. Alan John Hunter  King's Royal Rifle Corps
Lt.-Col. William Edwin Rumbold, Royal Artillery
Lt.-Col. Henry Rowan-Robinson  Royal Artillery
Lt.-Col. Edward Bunbury North  Royal Fusiliers
Maj. and Bt. Lt.-Col. Robert Napier Bray  West Riding Regiment
Maj. and Bt. Lt.-Col. Herbert de Lisle Pollard-Lowsley  Royal Engineers
Maj. and Bt. Lt.-Col. John Hugh Mackenzie  Royal Scots
Maj. and Bt. Lt.-Col. George Newell Thomas Smyth-Osbourne  Devonshire Regiment
Maj. and Bt. Lt.-Col. William Humphrey May Freestun  Somerset Light Infantry
Maj. and Bt. Lt.-Col. William Ernest Scaife  Devonshire Regiment
Lt.-Col. Frederick Rainsford Hannay  Royal Artillery
Lt.-Col. Trevor Irvine Nevitt Mears  Royal Army Service Corps
Lt.-Col. Francis Roger Sedgwick  Royal Artillery
Maj. and Bt. Lt.-Col. Llewellyn Murray Jones  Liverpool Regiment
Lt.-Col. Charles Allen Elliott  Royal Engineers
Maj. and Bt. Lt.-Col. Austin Hubert Wightwick Haywood  Royal Artillery
Lt.-Col. John Grahame Buchanan Allardyce  Royal Artillery
Maj. and Bt. Lt.-Col. Oscar Gilbert Brandon  Royal Engineers
Maj. and Bt. Lt.-Col. Charles Reginald Johnson  Royal Engineers
Maj. and Bt. Lt.-Col. William Athol Murray  Royal Artillery
Maj. and Bt. Lt.-Col. Vernon Monro Colquhoun Napier  Royal Artillery
Maj. and Bt. Lt.-Col. James Aloysius Francis Cuffe  Royal Munster Fusiliers
Maj. and Bt. Lt.-Col. George Camborne Beauclerk Paynter  Scots Guards
Maj. and Bt. Lt.-Col. John Laurence Buxton  Rifle Brigade
Maj. and Bt. Lt.-Col. Frederick Gordon Springy  Lincolnshire Regiment
Maj. and Bt. Lt., Col. Sanford John Palairet Scobell  Norfolk Regiment
Maj. and Bt. Lt.-Col. Compton Cardew Norman  Royal Welsh Fusiliers
Maj. and Bt. Lt.-Col. Nigel Keppel Charteris  Royal Scots, and M.G.G
Maj. and Bt. Lt.-Col. William Gwyther Charles  Essex Regiment
Maj. and Bt. Lt.-Col. William Norman Herbert  Northumberland Fusiliers
Maj. and Bt. Lt.-Col. Clive Osrio Vere Gray  Seaforth Highlanders
Maj. and Bt. Lt.-Col. Edward Henry Lionel Beddington  16th Lancers
Capt. and Bt. Lt.-Col. Thomas George Cope  Royal Fusiliers
Capt. and Bt. Lt.-Col. Bernard Cyril Freyburg  Grenadier Guards, late Royal West Surrey Regiment
Lt.-Col. Hubert de Lansey Walters  Royal Artillery
Maj. and Bt. Lt.-Col. Christopher Vaughan Edwards  Yorkshire Regiment
Maj. and Bt. Lt.-Col. Alexander Guthrie Thompson, 58th Rifles, Indian Army
Maj. and Bt. Lt.-Col. Reginald Heaton Locke Cutbill  Royal Army Service Corps
Maj. and Bt. Lt.-Col. Cyril Samuel Sackville Curteis  Royal Artillery
Maj. and Bt. Lt.-Col. Charles Edwin Vickery  Royal Artillery
Maj. and Bt. Lt.-Col. Francis George Alston  Scots Guards
Maj. and Bt. Lt.-Col. Henry Coventry Maitland Makgill Crichton  Royal Scots Fusiliers
Maj. and Bt. Lt.-Col. Stephen Seymour Butler  South Staffordshire Regiment
Maj. and Bt. Lt.-Col. Edward Robert Clayton  Oxfordshire and Buckinghamshire Light Infantry
Maj. and Bt. Lt.-Col. Frederick Courtney Tanner  Royal Scots
Maj. and Bt. Lt.-Col. George Mackintosh Lindsay  Rifle Brigade
Maj. and Bt. Lt.-Col. Robert Francis Guy  Wiltshire Regiment
Maj. and Bt. Lt.-Col. Joseph Ernest Munby  Yorkshire Light Infantry
Maj. and Bt. Lt.-Col. Cuthbert Garrard Browne  Royal Army Medical Corps
Maj. and Bt. Lt.-Col. Gordon Harry Gill  Royal Army Service Corps
Maj.and Bt. Lt.-Col. Cecil Barrington Norton  Ret. Pay
Capt. and Bt. Lt.-Col. Hon Roger Brand  Rifle Brigade
Maj. and Bt. Lt.-Col. George Ronald Hamilton Cheape  1st Dragoon Guards
Lt.-Col. Charles Frank Rundall  Royal Engineers
Maj. and Bt. Lt.-Col. Henry Donald Buchanan-Dunlop  Royal West Kent Regiment, and Machine Gun Corps
Maj. Harold Futvoye Lea  late Yorkshire Regiment
Maj. Henry Schofield Rogers  late Royal Engineers
Maj. George Harold-Abseiling  2nd Dragoon Guards
Maj. Sir Dudley Baines Forwood  
Maj. Reginald Wingfield Castle  Royal Artillery
Maj. Abel Mellor  Royal Artillery
Maj. Robert Carlisle Williams  Royal Artillery
Maj. Charles Wesley Weldon McLean  Royal Artillery
Maj. Harold James Norman Davis  Connaught Rangers, and Machine Gun Corps
Maj. William John Shannon  16th Lancers, attd. Tank Corps
Maj. Lewis Pugh Evans  Royal Highlanders
Maj. Edward Martyn Woulfe Flanagan  East Surrey Regiment, attd. Oxfordshire and Buckinghamshire Light Infantry
Maj. Robert Riversdale Smyth  Leinster Regiment
Maj. Augustus Francis Andrew Nicol Thome  Grenadier Guards
Maj. Edward Michael Conolly, ret. pay, late Royal Artillery
Capt. and Bt. Maj. Edward Cotton Jury  18th Hussars
Maj. Alexander Campbell  Royal Engineers
Maj. Desmond Francis Anderson  East Yorkshire Regiment
Temp Maj. Henry William Laws  Royal Engineers
Maj. Joseph Harold Stops Westley  Yorkshire Regiment
Temp Maj. Ewart James Collett  Middlesex Regiment, attd. London Regiment
Maj. Augustus Cecil Hale Duke 
Temp Maj. John Patrick Hunt  
Temp Lt.-Col. Edward William Macleay Grigg  Grenadier Guards

Canadian Forces
Brig. Gen. Robert Walter Paterson  Fort Garry Horse
Brig. Gen. John Arthur Clark  British Columbia Regiment
Brig. Gen. Robert Percy Clark  Quebec Regiment
Col. Halfdan Fenton Harboe Hertzberg  Canadian Engineers
Lt.-Col. Harold Halford Matthews  Manitoba Regiment
Lt.-Col. James Kirkcaldy  Manitoba Regiment
Lt.-Col. Samuel Boyd Anderson  Canadian Field Artillery
Lt.-Col. Louis Elgin Jones  Western Ontario Regiment
Lt.-Col. Alfred Blake Carey  Central Ontario Regiment
Lt.-Col. Fred Lister  Central Ontario Regiment
Lt.-Col. Lorne Talbot McLaughlin  Eastern Ontario Regiment
Lt.-Col. Percival John Montague  Manitoba Regiment
Lt.-Col. James Layton Ralston  Nova Scotia Regiment
Lt.-Col. Joseph Bartlett Rogers  1st Central Ontario Regiment
Lt.-Col. Stancliffe Wallace Watson  Canadian Machine Gun Corps
Lt.-Col. Edward Robert Wayland, New Brunswick Regiment
Brig. Gen. Andrew George Latta McNaughton  Canadian Field Artillery

Australian Force
Lt.-Col. Cecil Arthur Callaghan  Australian Field Artillery
Col. Owen Forbes Phillips 
Col. Sydney Charles Edgar Herring  
Lt.-Col. Thomas Peel Dunhill, Australian Army Medical Corps
Lt.-Col. Frederick Royden Chalmers  Australian Imperial Force
Lt.-Col. John Montague Christian Corlette  Australia Engineers
Lt.-Col. Patrick Currie  Australian Imperial Force
Lt.-Col. Frederick William Dempster Forbes  Australian Imperial Force
Lt.-Col. William Alexander Henderson  Australia Engineers
Lt.-Col. Alexander Robert Heron  Australian Imperial Force
Lt.-Col. John Edward Cecil Lord  Australian Imperial Force
Lt.-Col. Henry Dundas Keith Macartney  Australian Field Artillery
Lt.-Col. Henry William Murray  Australia Machine Gun Corps
Lt.-Col. Harold William Riggall  Australian Imperial Force
Lt.-Col. Alfred George Salisbury  Australian Imperial Force
Lt.-Col. Harold Fletcher White  Australian Imperial Force
Lt.-Col. Thomas Rhys Williams  Aust. Engineers
Lt.-Col. Aubrey Roy Liddon Wiltshire  Australian Imperial Force
Lt.-Col. Henry Douglas Wynter 

New Zealand Forces
Lt.-Col. Stephen Shepherd Allen  Auckland Regiment
Lt.-Col. Henry Esau Avery  NZ Staff Corps
Lt.-Col. Hugh Stewart  Canterbury Regiment
Lt.-Col. Alexander Edward Stewart  NZ Rifle Brigade

South African Forces
Temp Maj. Newdigate Halford Marriott Burne  attd. Shropshire Light Infantry
Temp Lt.-Col. George Ritchie Thomson  SA Medical Corps
Temp Maj. Thomas Lyttleton de Havilland  Union Defence Force of South Africa,  Royal Guernsey Light Infantry

For valuable services rendered in connection with military operations in Italy —
Lt.-Col. and Bt. Col. John Byron  Royal Artillery
Maj. and Bt. Col. Henry Lethbridge Alexander  Dorsetshire Regiment
Temp Lt.-Col. Douglas Quirk  Yorkshire Light Infantry
Maj. and Bt. Lt.-Col. John Earner Turner  Sea. Rifles
Maj. and Bt. Lt.-Col. Cuthbert Frederick Graham Page  Royal Garrison Artillery
Maj. and Bt. Lt.-Col. Eric Felton Falkner  Royal Army Service Corps
Maj. and Bt. Lt.-Col. John Holgate Bateson  Royal Garrison Artillery
Maj. and Bt. Lt.-Col. Henry Cecil Lloyd Howard  16th Lancers
Maj. and Bt. Lt.-Col. Harold Richard Sandilands  Northumberland Fusiliers

For services rendered in connection with military operations in Mesopotamia —
Col. Hugh Clement Sutton  late Coldstream Guards
Col. William Thomas Mould, late Royal Army Medical Corps
Lt.-Col. Murray Ray de Bruyne James, Royal Army Service Corps
Lt.-Col. Charles Mackenzie  13th Lancers, Indian Army
Lt.-Col. Frank Evelyn Coningham  1/10th Gurkha Rifles, Indian Army
Maj. and Bt. Lt.-Col. Thomas Reginald Fraser Bate, Royal Artillery
Lt.-Col. Edward Herbert Sweet  2nd Gurkha Rifles, Indian Army
Maj. and Bt. Lt.-Col. Arthur William Hamilton May Moens  52nd Sikhs, Indian Army

For services rendered in connection with military operations in North Russia (Archangel Command) —

Temp Lt.-Col. James Dayrolles Crosbie 

Canadian Forces
Lt.-Col. Charles Henry Ludovic Sharman  Canadian Field Artillery

For services rendered in connection with military operations in North Russia (Murmansk Command) — 
Maj. Edward Lawton Moss  Royal Army Medical Corps

The Most Eminent Order of the Indian Empire

Knight Commander (KCIE)

Charles Ernest Low  Indian Civil Service, Member of the Indian Industrial Commission
Maharaj Kunwar Bhopal Singh, of Udaipur, Rajputana
Nawab Khan Bahadur Mir Shams Shah  Wazir-i-Azam, Kalat State, Baluchistan

For valuable services rendered in connection with the military operations in France —
Lt.-Gen. Sir Edward Locke Elliot

Companion (CIE)

Purushottamdas Thakurdas  Additional Member of the Council of His Excellency the Governor, Bombay
Khan Bahadur Khwaja Yusaf Shah, Member of the Legislative Council of the Punjab
Norman Edward Marjoribanks, Indian Civil Service, Additional Member of the Council of His Excellency the Governor, and Commissioner of Land Revenue and Forests, Madras
Atul Chandra Chatarji, Indian Civil Service, Revenue Secretary to the Government of the United Provinces
Robert Duncan Bell, Indian Civil Service, Secretary, Indian Industrial Commission and Controller of Industrial Intelligence
Rai Bahadur Rala Ram  Chief Engineer, Eastern Bengal Railway, Bengal
Lt.-Col. Henry Cecil Beadon, Indian Army, Deputy Commissioner, Delhi
Herbert Charles Barnes, Indian Civil Service, Deputy Commissioner, Naga Hills, Assam
Harold Clayton, Indian Civil Service, Registrar of Co-operative Credit Societies, Maymyo, Burma
Charles Bevan Petman, Government Advocate, Punjab
Frank Arthur Money Hampe Vincent  Commissioner of Police, Bombay
Reginald Clarke, Commissioner of Police, Calcutta, Bengal
Mark James Cogswell, Controller of Printing, Stationery and Stamps
Lt.-Col. William Dunbar Sutherland, Indian Medical Service, Imperial Serologist, Calcutta, and Chemical Examiner to the Government of Bengal
Lt.-Col. John Joseph Bourke, Indian Medical Service, Assay Master and Officiating Mint Master, Calcutta
Lt.-Col. John Stephenson, Indian Medical Service, Principal and Professor of Biology, Government College, Lahore, Punjab
Henry Haselfoot Haines, Conservator of Forests, Bihar and Orissa
Robert Selby Hole, Imperial Forest Botanist, Denra Dun, United Provinces
Cursetji Nowroji Wadia, Bombay
Eric Teichman, British Consular Service, China
David Houston, Director of Agriculture, Central Provinces
Charles Alfred Bell  Indian Civil Service (retired), late Political Officer in Sikkim
Raja Bahadur Rao Jogendra Narayan Ray, of Lalgola, Bengal
Norendra Nath Sen, Dewan, Cooch Behar State, and Member, State Council, Bengal
William John Bradshaw

For meritorious services connected with the War —
Lt.-Col. Richard Arthur Needham  Indian Medical Service, Deputy Director-Gen., Indian Medical Service
Josiah Crosby  His Britannic Majesty's Consul, Saigon
Charles Alexander Innes, Indian Civil Service, Controller of Munitions, Madras
Philip Peveril John Wodehouse, Deputy Superintendent of Police, Hong Kong
Capt. Edward Ivo Medhurst Barrett, Assistant Superintendent of Police, Shanghai
Samuel Findlater Stewart, Deputy Secretary, Military Department, India Office

For services in connection with military operations in East Africa— 
Maj. Patrick Laurence O'Neill, Indian Medical Service
Capt. Gordon Grey Jolly  Indian Medical Service
Maj. Arthur Pitcher Manning  Indian Telegraph Department

For services in connection with the military operations in Mesopotamia —

Lt. Henry Harry Francis Macdonald Tyler, Indian Army Reserve of Officers
Col. Henry William Richard Senior  Indian Army
Lt.-Col. Ralph Henry Maddox, Indian Medical Service
Lt.-Col. Herbert Walter Bowen  Indian Ordnance Department
Lieu tenant-Col. James William Milne, 82nd Punjabis, Indian Army
Lt.-Col. James Blair Keogh  32nd Lancers
Bt. Lt.-Col. Edward Albert Porch  Supply and Transport Corps
Maj. Arthur Brownfield Fry  Indian Medical Service
Maj. Adrian Victor Webley Hope, 32nd Pioneers
Maj. Leonard Erskine Gilbert, Indian Medical Service
Maj. William, David Acheson Keys  Indian Medical Service
Maj. William Maurice Anderson  Indian Medical Service
Maj. Howard Murray, Military Accounts. Department
Capt. and Bt. Maj. Charles de Lona Christopher, Supply and TransportCorps
Capt. and Bt. Maj. Frederic Maxwell Carpendale, 42nd Deoli Regiment
Maj. Arthur Henry Chenevix Trench, Royal Engineers
Temporary Maj. Leonard Field Nalder, Special List, attached Political Department
Capt. Charles Geoffrey Lloyd, Supply and Transport Corps
Temporary Capt. Robert Marrs, Special List, attached Political Department
Lt. Geoffrey Evans, Indian Army Reserve of Officers
2nd Lt. Samuel Henry Slater, Indian Army Reserve of Officers
Agha Mirza Muhammad, Political Department
Edgar Bonham-Carter  Sudan Legal Department. (Retired.)
Maj. and Bt. Lt.-Col. John Hyndman Howell-Jones  Royal Army Ordnance Corps
Lt.-Col. Walter Edward Wilson-Johnston  36th Sikhs, Indian Army
Maj. William Southall Reid May, Sudan Civil Service
Temporary Capt. W. R. Dockrill, Royal Engineers
Temporary Lt. George Mackenzie O'Rorke  Royal Engineers

The Royal Victorian Order

Knight Grand Cross of the Royal Victorian Order (GCVO)
Lt.-Col. the Rt. Hon The Lord Edmund Bernard Talbot

Knight Commander of the Royal Victorian Order (KCVO)
Lt.-Gen. Sir Francis John Davies 
Rear-Admiral Sir Douglas Romilly Lothian Nicholson  (Dated 24 April 1919.)
Sir William Henry Weldon  Clarenceux King of Arms
Capt. Bryan Godfrey Godfrey-Faussett 
Frederick Morris Fry
George John Marjoribanks
Joseph Oliver Skevington

Commander of the Royal Victorian Order (CVO)
Sir Alexander Cruikshank Houston 
John Mitchell Bruce 
Col. William Baume Capper

Member of the Royal Victorian Order, 4th class (MVO)
The Hon Lionel Michael St. Aubyn
Maj. Sydney Arthur Hunn  (Dated 15 May 1919.)
Maj. Henry Fox Atkinson-Clark 
Walter George Covington
Evelyn Campbell Shaw
Maj. Harold James Clifford Stanton

Member of the Royal Victorian Order, 5th class (MVO)
George Francis Dixon 
George Frederick Cotton

The Most Excellent Order of the British Empire

Dame Commander of the Order of the British Empire (DBE)

Military Division
In recognition of distinguished services rendered during the War —
Helen Charlotte Isabella Gwynne-Vaughan  Women's Royal Air Force
Sarah Elizabeth Oram  Principal Matron, Queen Alexandra's Imperial Military Nursing Service

Civil Division
The Honourable Mary, Lady Monro
Una, Lady O'Dwyer  Punjab

Commonwealth of Australia
Alice, Lady Northcote
Florence Rose, Countess of Darnley

Crown Colonies, Protectorates, Etc.
Mabel Danvers, Countess of Harrowby, for services in connection with the entertainment of Officers of the Overseas Forces

Knight Commander of the Order of the British Empire (KBE)

Military Division
For services rendered in connection with military operations in the Balkans —
Col. Arthur Long  Royal Army Service Corps
Col. Hugh Davie White-Thomson  Royal Artillery

For valuable services rendered in connection with military operations in Egypt —
Maj.-Gen. Sir Arthur Wigram Money  Royal Artillery
Col. Sir Robert Whyte Melville Jackson  Royal Army Ordnance Corps
Col. Harry Davis Watson  Indian Army
Lt.-Col. and Bt. Col. Michael Graham Egerton Bowman-Manifold  Royal Engineers
Maj. and Bt. Col. Gilbert Falkingham Clayton  Royal Artillery

For valuable services rendered in connection with military operations in France and Flanders —
Col. Valentine Murray  Royal Engineers
Maj. Hamilton Ashley Ballance  Royal Army Medical Corps
Col. Robert Hammill Firth  Army Medical Service

For services rendered in connection with military operations in Italy —
Temp Col. Charles Gordon-Watson  Army Medical Service

In recognition of services of in connection with the War —
Royal Navy
Rear-Admiral Charles Lionel Vaughan-Lee 
Surgeon Rear-Admiral William Wenmoth Pryn 
Surgeon Rear-Admiral Patrick Brodie Handyside 
Capt. Herbert Edward Purey-Cust  (Admiral, retired)
Surgeon Capt. Daniel Joseph Patrick McNabb 
Surgeon Capt. Arthur Stanley Nance 
Paymaster Capt. Francis Cooke Alton 

Army
Lt.-Col. Arthur William Forbes  Indian Army
Col. Francis James Anderson  late Royal Engineers
Col. Edward Hamilton Seymour  Royal Army Ordnance Corps
Col. Arthur Robert Dick  Indian Army
Col. Dudley Howard Ridout  Royal Engineers
Maj.-Gen. Hon Charles John Sackville-West  late King's Royal Rifle Corps
Lt.-Col. and Bt. Col. Frederick Cuthbert Poole  Royal Artillery
Col. George Bradshaw Stanistreet  Army Medical Service
Lt.-Col. Henry Davy  Royal Army Medical Corps
Lt.-Col. and Bt. Col. German Sims Woodhead  Royal Army Medical Corps
Lt.-Col. Sir Shirley Forster Murphy  Royal Army Medical Corps
Lt.-Col. D'Arcy Power  Royal Army Medical Corps
Temp Lt.-Col. James Leigh-Wood  
Maj. Henry Mcilree Williamson Gray  Royal Army Medical Corps
Maj. Sir Arthur William Mayo-Robson  Royal Army Medical Corps
Maj. Charters James Symonds  Royal Army Medical Corps
Maj. and Bt. Lt.-Col. Frederick Walker Mott  Royal Army Medical Corps
Maj. Sir Robert Jones  Royal Army Medical Corps
Capt. Archibald Douglas Reid  Royal Army Medical Corps
Lt.-Gen. Sir Herbert Eversley Belfield  West Riding Regiment
Col. and Hon Maj.-Gen. Francis George Bond  Staff
Col. Robert Calverley Alington Bewicke-Copley  King's Royal Rifle Corps
Col. Robert Megaw Ireland  Army Pay Department
Col. George William Hacket Pain  
Lt.-Col. Sir Edward Raban  Royal Engineers
Lt.-Col. and Bt. Col. Arthur Granville Balfour  Highland Light Infantry
Lt.-Col. and Bt. Col. Hill Godfrey Morgan  Royal Army Service Corps
Maj. and Bt. Lt.-Col. Lord Arthur Howe Browne, Royal Munster Fusiliers
Maj. and Bt. Lt.-Col. Vernon George Waldegrave Kell  South Staffordshire Regiment
Lt.-Col. Robert William Edis  London Regiment
Col. Robert Campbell MacKenzie  
Col. Herbrand Arthur, The Duke of Bedford  late Bedfordshire Regiment

Australian Imperial Forces
Col. Charles Snodgrass Ryan  Royal Army Medical Corps
Maj.-Gen. The Hon Sir James Whiteside McCay  Staff

Civil Division

British India
Nawab Sir Bahrain Khan  Mazari of the Dera Ghazi Khan District, Member of the Legislative Council of the Punjab. 
Raja Daljit Singh  Chief Minister Jammu and Kashmir State
Lt.-Col. Sardar Appaji Rao Sitole 
Amir-ul-Umra, Member of the Majlis-i-Khas, Gwalior State, Central India

Union of South Africa
William Dingwall Mitchell Cotts, for services in connection with recruiting
Col. Henry Walter Hamilton Fowle  Commissioner of Enemy subjects and Custodian of Enemy property
Harry Hands, ex-Mayor of Cape Town, for services in connection with recruiting and other war work
Senator Col. the Hon. Walter Ernest Mortimer Stanford  Director of war recruiting and Commissioner for returned soldiers

Newfoundland
The Honourable John Chalker Crosbie, Minister of Shipping, Chairman of the Tonnage Committee

Crown Colonies, Protectorates, Etc.
Charles Calvert Bowring  Chief Secretary to the Government, East Africa Protectorate, for services as President of the War Council and Acting Governor of the Protectorate
Francis Charles Bernard Dudley Fuller  Chief Commissioner, Ashanti
Lt.-Col. Raleigh Grey  Member of the Legislative Council of Southern Rhodesia
Sir Henry Francis Wilson  Secretary, Royal Colonial Institute, Member of the Empire Land Settlement Committee and War Services Committee
William Douglas Young  Governor and Commander-in-Chief of the Falkland Islands

Honorary Knight Commander
His Highness Seyyid Khalifa bin Harub, Sultan of Zanzibar

Commander of the Order of the British Empire (CBE)

Military Division

For services rendered in connection with military operations in the Balkans —
Maj. and Bt. Lt.-Col. George William Dowell  Rem. Service
Temp Col. Leonard Stanley Dudgeon  Army Medical Service
Temp Lt.-Col. Arthur Wellesley Falconer  Royal Army Medical Corps
Capt. Eric Gerald Gauntlett  Royal Army Medical Corps
Capt. and Bt. Maj. Harry Upington Hooper, Royal Engineers
Rev. William Stevenson Jaffray  Royal Army Chaplains' Department
Temp Maj. Reginald Keble Morcom  Royal Engineers
Col. Herbert Chidgey Brine Payne  Army Pay Department
Capt. and Bt. Maj. Godfrey Dean Rhodes  Royal Engineers
Maj. and Bt. Lt.-Col. Digby Inglis Shuttleworth, Indian Army
Col. William Hugh Usher Smith  Royal Army Ordnance Corps
Capt. and Bt. Maj. George Brian Ogilvie Taylor, Royal Engineers
Lt.-Col. Charles Walter Villiers  Coldstream Guards
Temp Lt.-Col. Charles Morley Wenyon  Royal Army Medical Corps

For valuable services rendered in connection with military operations in East Africa— 
Quartermaster and Capt. Ernest Dwyer  Royal Army Service Corps
Maj. and Bt. Lt.-Col. Robert Blackall Graham, 33rd Punjabis, Indian Army

For valuable service rendered in connection with military operations in France —
Temp Lt.-Col. Charles Murray Abercrombie  labour Corps
Temp Col. John Heathcote Addie
Col. John Donald Alexander  late Royal Army Medical Corps
Temp Lt.-Col. James Dalgleish Anderson  Royal Army Service Corps
Col. Reginald le Normand Brabazon, Lord Ardee 
Lt.-Col. Herbert Tollemache Arnold  Army Pay Department
Maj. and Bt. Lt.-Col. Jasper Baker, Royal Army Ordnance Corps
Temp Lt.-Col. Alfred George Barnett  
Col. Frank Warburton Begbie, late Royal Army Medical Corps
Col. Wilfred William Ogilvy Beveridge  late Royal Army Medical Corps
Temp Lt.-Col. Edward Augustane Blount  
Col. Stewart Bogle-Smith 
Lt.-Col. Arthur Winniett Nunn Bowen  Royal Army Medical Corps
Maj. Sir John Rose Bradford  Royal Army Medical Corps
Temp Lt.-Col. Francis Powell Braithwaite  Royal Engineers
Temp Maj. William Philip Sutcliffe Branson  Royal Army Medical Corps
Lt.-Col. William Bromley-Davenport  Special Reserve
Col. Sherwood Dighton Browne  late Royal Artillery
Lt.-Col. Bernard Bruce Burke  Royal Army Medical Corps
Capt. Harold Burrows  Royal Army Medical Corps
Lt.-Col. and Bt. Col. James Paul Bush  Royal Army Medical Corps
Lt.-Col. Eustace Maude Callender, Royal Army Medical Corps
Lt.-Col. John Hay Campbell  Royal Army Medical Corps
Rev. John Garden  Royal Army Chaplains' Department
Lt.-Col. George Ross Marryab Church  Royal Garrison Artillery
Lt.-Col. John Clay  Royal Army Medical Corps
Temp Maj. Robert Higham Cooper, Royal Army Medical Corps
Temp Lt.-Col. Edward Kyme Cordeaux, Labour Corps
Temp Lt.-Col. Gerald Oldroyd Cornock-Taylor (dated 25 February 1919)
Temp Lt.-Col. John Duncan Campbell Couper, Royal Engineers
Maj. Henry Edward Colvin Cowie  Royal Engineers
Lt.-Col. Robert Langely Cranford  Royal Army Veterinary Corps
Chief Controller Lila Davy  Queen Mary's Army Auxiliary Corps
Lt.-Col. and Bt. Col. William L'Estrange Eames  Royal Army Medical Corps
Temp Col. Thomas Renton Elliott  Army Medical Service
Lt.-Col. Otto William Alexander Eisner  Royal Army Medical Corps
Col. Henry Adeane Erskine  Royal Army Service Corps
Col. Magrath Fogarty Fegen, late Royal Artillery
Maj. and Bt. Lt.-Col. John Gibson Fleming  Royal Engineers
Capt. and Bt. Maj. Claude Howard Stanley Frankau  Royal Army Medical Corps
Lt.-Col. Thomas Eraser  Royal Army Medical Corps
Temp Capt. Forbes Fraser, Royal Army Medical Corps
Maj. and Bt. Col. Evan Gibb  Royal Army Service Corps
Col. Thomas Wykes Gibbard  late Royal Army Medical Corps
Lt.-Col. George Mills Goldsmith, Royal Army Medical Corps
Maj. Charles Percy Graham  Welsh Regiment
Col. Henry William Grattan  late Royal Army Medical Corps
Maj. Archibald Montague Henry Gray, Royal Army Medical Corps
Capt. Hon Frederick Edward Guest  1st Life Guards
Rt. Rev. Bishop Llewellyn Henry Gwynne  Royal Army Chaplains' Department
Maj. John Robinson Harper, Royal Army Medical Corps
Lt.-Col. and Bt. Col. Cholmeley Edward Carl Branfill Harrison  late Royal West Kent Regiment
Temp Maj. Harold Hartley  Royal Engineers
Lt.-Col. Edwin Charles Hayes, Royal Army Medical Corps
Lt.-Col. Alan Major Henniker, Royal Engineers
Temp Lt.-Col. Maxwell Hicks, Royal Army Service Corps
Lt.-Col. Frederick William Higgs, Royal Army Medical Corps
Temp Lt.-Col. Gordon Morgan Holmes  Royal Army Medical Corps
Lt.-Col. Cyril Henry Howkins  Royal Army Medical Corps
Col. Wilfrid Edward Hudleston  late Royal Army Medical Corps
Lt.-Col. and Bt. Col. Frederick Welsley Hunt  Royal Army Veterinary Corps
Lt.-Col. Dermot Owen Hyde  Royal Army Medical Corps
Maj. and Bt. Lt.-Col. George Scott Jackson  Northumberland Fusiliers and Royal Army Medical Corps
Maj. Archibald Offley Jenney, Royal Scots
Lt.-Col. Herbert William Graham Keddie  Royal Army Ordnance Corps
Temp Col. Francis Kelly, Royal Army Medical Corps
Maj. and Bt. Col. Charles Arthur Ker  Royal Artillery
Maj. Edmund Larken  Lincolnshire Yeomanry
Lt.-Col. John Gage Lecky, Royal Army Service Corps
Maj. and Bt. Lt.-Col. Reginald Francis Legge  Leinster Regiment
Capt. Alexander Dunlop Lindsay  
Temp Capt. Ernest Charles Lindsay  Royal Army Medical Corps
Col. John Constantine Gordon Longmore 
Temp Lt.-Col. David Lyell  Royal Engineers
Maj. Henry MacCormac  Royal Army Medical Corps
Lt.-Col. Arthur Maunsell MacLaughlin, Royal Army Medical Corps
Col. Robert Lockhart Roes Macleod  Royal Army Medical Corps
Maj. and Bt. Lt.-Col. Arthur George Preston McNalty  Royal Army Service Corps
Maj. and Bt. Lt.-Col. Hubert William Man  Royal Army Ordnance Corps
Rev. Thomas Heywood Masters, Royal Army Chaplains' Department
Temp Maj. Harry Maud  
Temp Maj. Charles Hewitt Miller, Royal Army Medical Corps
Lt.-Col. Edward Darley Miller  Pembroke Yeomanry
Lt.-Col. and Bt. Col. Robert Cotton Money  King's Own Yorkshire Light Infantry
Hon Col. Lord Henry Francis Montagu-Douglas-Scott
Col. Frederick James Morgan  late Royal Army Medical Corps
Maj. Alan Henry Lawrence Mount  Royal Engineers
Temp Col. Percy Reginald Nelson  Royal Army Service Corps
Col. Augustus Charles Newsom  Royal Army Veterinary Corps
Maj. William Alfred Pallin  Royal Army Veterinary Corps
Lt.-Col. Walter Bagot Pearson  Lancashire Fusiliers
Maj. Ernest Middleton Perry  Royal Army Veterinary Corps
Maj. Charles Duncan Peterkin, Gordon Highlanders
Col. Edgar Montagu Pilcher  late Royal Army Medical Corps
Lt.-Col. Charles Edward Pollock  Royal Army Medical Corps
Maj. Robert Valentine Pollok  Irish Guards
Col. Harold Vernon Prynne  late Royal Army Medical Corps
Maj. and Bt. Lt.-Col. Frederick Walter Radcliffe  Dorsetshire Regiment
Lt.-Col. and Bt. Col. Jacob Pleydell-Bouverie, Earl of Radnor, T.F. Reserve
Temp Lt.-Col. Charles Edward Ramsbottom-Isherwood
Col. Herbert Frechville Smythe Ramsden, Indian Army
Lt.-Col. and Bt. Col. Claude Rawnsley  Royal Army Service Corps
Lt.-Col. Frederick James Reid  Royal Army Service Corps
Temp Lt.-Col. Regiriald Philip Neri Reynolds  Royal Engineers
Capt. and Bt. Lt.-Col. Ambrose St. Quintin Ricardo  Royal Inniskilling Fusiliers
Temp Capt. and Bt. Maj. John Robertson, Royal Engineers
Maj. and Bt. Lt.-Col. Hugh Stuart Rogers  Shropshire Light Infantry
Lt.-Col. Thomas William Rudd, Royal Army Veterinary Corps
Capt. Charles Frederick Morris Saint  Royal Army Medical Corps
Col. Harry Neptune Sargent  Royal Army Service Corps
Lt.-Col. and Bt. Col. George-Walter Wrey Saville  Middlesex Regiment
Temp Maj. Frank Searle  Tank Corps
Maj. Francis Stewart Kennedy Shaw, Rem. Service
Lt.-Col. John Payzant Silver  Royal Army Medical Corps
Temp Lt.-Col. Lightly Stapleton Simpson  Royal Engineers
Rev. Charles William Smith  Royal Army Chaplains' Department
Lt.-Col. Charles Louis Spencer, Royal Engineers
Temp Maj. Frederick Newton Gisbone Starr, Royal Army Medical Corps
Col. John Charles Baron Statham  late Royal Army Medical Corps
Maj. and Bt. Lt.-Col. Godfrey Robert Viveash Steward  Royal Inniskilling Fusiliers
Rev. Frank White Stewart  Royal Army Chaplains' Department
Maj. and Bt. Lt.-Col. Sir George Murray Home Stirling  Essex Regiment
Temp Col. John Donald Sutherland
Lt.-Col. Walter John Tatam  Royal Army Veterinary Corps
Col. Hugh Stanley Thurston  late Royal Army Medical Corps
Maj. and Bt. Lt.-Col. Percy Umfreville 
Maj. Hon Osbert Eustace Vesey  Royal East Kent Yeomanry
Maj. and Bt. Lt.-Col. Edward Gurth Wace  Royal Engineers
Maj. and Bt. Lt.-Col. Edward John Wadley  Royal Army Veterinary Corps
Temp Lt.-Col. Charles Waley Cohen
Maj. and Bt. Lt.-Col. Mainwaring Ravell Walsh  Worcestershire Regiment
Temp Maj. Thomas Percival Wansbrough, Royal Army Service Corps
Capt. and Bt. Maj. Henry Watkins, George, Coldstream Guards
Lt.-Col. Francis Wyatt Watling  Royal Engineers
Temp Col. Alfred Edward Webb-Johnson  Royal Army Medical Corps
Lt.-Col. and Bt. Col. Frederick Hibbart Westmacott, Royal Army Medical Corps
Maj. and Bt. Lt.-Col. James Whitehead  1st Brahmans, Indian Army
Lt.-Col. Ernest Arnold Wraith  Royal Army Medical Corps

Canadian Overseas Forces
Col. Lorne Drum
Rev. George Oliver Fallis, Canadian Army Chaplains' Department
Lt.-Col. Atholl Edwin Griffin  Canadian Railway Troops
Lt.-Col. Edward Vincent Hogan, Canadian Army Medical Corps
Maj. Herbert Molsom  Quebec Regiment
Lt.-Col. Blair Ripley  Canadian Railway Troops
Col. Robert Mills Simpson 
Lt.-Col. Charles Perry Templeton  Canadian Army Medical Corps
Lt.-Col. Guy Mansfield Todd, Canadian Army Pay Corps
Maj. Arthur William Roger Wilby
Lt.-Col. Francis Walter Ernest Wilson, Canadian Army Medical Corps

Australian Imperial Forces
Col. Charles Herbert Davis 
Lt.-Col. Edwin Thomas Leane, Australian Army Ordnance Corps
Col. Alexander Hammett Marks 
Col. Arthur Edmund Shepherd 
Col. Walter Howard Tunbridge 
Lt.-Col. Horace George Viney 

South African Forces
Capt. Charles de Vertus Duff, 2nd Res. Battalion

For valuable services rendered in connection with military operations in German South West Africa —
Temp Maj. and Bt. Lt.-Col. Albert Henry Mortimer Nussey 

For valuable services rendered in connection with military operations in Italy —
Maj. and Bt. Lt.-Col. Robert Morris Campbell  Royal Army Service Corps
Temp Lt.-Col. Sir William Stewart Dick-Cunyngham  
Col. Thomas Wyatt Hale  Royal Army Ordnance Corps
Capt. Thomas Phillips Bobbins, Royal Engineers
Lt.-Col. James Currie Robertson  Indian Medical Service
Maj. Ernest Albert Rose  Royal Army Service Corps
Maj. Williams Hugh Cecil Rowe  Royal Army Service Corps
Temp Lt.-Col. Robert Stephenson  South Staffordshire Regiment
Lt.-Col. Hugh Godfrey Killigrew Wait  Royal Engineers
Rev. Owen Spencer Watkins  Royal Army Chaplains' Department

For valuable services rendered in connection with military operations in North Russia (Murmansk Command) —
Col. Gilbert Sutherland McDowell Elliot, Royal Engineers

For valuable services rendered in connection with military operations in Mesopotamia —
Temp Lt.-Col. Philip Henry Browne  
Maj. and Bt. Lt.-Col. James Clare Macnamara Canny  Royal Army Service Corps
Capt. and Bt. Maj. Frank Button Frost  Supply and Transport Ops Indian Army
Temp Maj. Robert George Garrow  Royal Engineers
Col. Elliot Brownlow Lang
Maj. and Bt. Lt.-Col. Francis William George Leland  Royal Army Service Corps
Temp Maj. Robert Scarth Farquhar Macrae 
Maj. and Bt. Lt.-Col. Robert Henry McVittie  Royal Army Ordnance Corps
Col. Arthur Hugh Morris
Lt.-Col. Hugh Murray Morton  Royal Army Medical Corps
Temp Maj. Harold Edward Ratsey  Royal Engineers
Col. William Henderson Starr 
Maj. Colin Percy Tremlett, Devonshire Regiment
Temp Maj. Egerton Danford Truman  Royal Engineers
Maj. and Bt. Lt.-Col. William Albert Wood, Royal Army Veterinary Corps

In recognition of distinguished services rendered during the War—
Lt.-Col. Ralph Kirkby Bagnall-Wild  Royal Engineers
Lt.-Col. Bryan Cole Bartley
Col. Arthur Milton, Bent  Royal Munster Fusiliers
Lt.-Col. the Hon John David Boyle  Rifle Brigadef
Lt.-Col. Charles Stuart Burnett  Highland Light Infantry
Col. Bertram Hewett Hunter Cooke  Rifle Brigade
Lt.-Col. Edward Humphrey Davidson  Gordon Highlanders
Col. Bertie Clephane Hawley Drew  Indian Army
Lt.-Col. John Dunville 
Maj.-Gen. Edward Leonard Ellington  Royal Artillery
Lt.-Col. Philip Lee William Herbert  Nottinghamshire and Derbyshire Regiment 
Lt.-Col. Cuthbert Gurney Hoare  Indian Army
Lt.-Col. Charles Frewen Jenkin 
Lt.-Col. Cecil Colvile Marindin  Royal Artillery
Maj. Edward Patrick Alexander Melville  Indian Army
Lt.-Col. Robert Henry More  Imperial Yeomanry
Lt.-Col. Redford Henry Mulock 
Lt.-Col. Cyril Louis Norton Newall  Indian Army
Maj. Edward Osmond
Col. Duncan Le Geyt Pitcher  Indian Army
Lt.-Col. Reginald Edmund Maghlin Russell  Royal Engineers
Maj. William John Ryan  Army Service Corps
Lt.-Col. Sydney Ernest Smith  Gloucestershire Regiment
Col. Oliver Swann 
Lt.-Col. Arthur Sykes  Royal Irish Fusiliers
Lt.-Col. James George Weir  Royal Field Artillery
Lt.-Col. Hardy Vesey Wells
Col. Kenneth Wigram  Indian Army

In recognition of services of in connection with the War —
Royal Navy
Surgeon Capt. Octavius William Andrews 
Maj. George Edward Barnes, Royal Marine Artillery
Maj. Dacre Lennard Barrett, Royal Marine Light Infantry
Capt. Ronald Evered Chilcott 
Capt. Arthur Calvert Clarke  (Vice-Admiral, retired)
Rear-Admiral Lewis Clinton-Baker 
Paymaster Commander Beauchamp Urquhart Colclough
Engineer Capt. Arthur Samuel Crisp 
Maj. William Price Drury, Royal Marine Light Infantry
Paymaster Capt. Edward Henry Eldred
Engineer Capt. Samuel Pringle Ferguson
Capt. Ernest James Fleet  (Rear-Admiral, retired)
Lt.-Col. Gerald Noel Anstice Harris  Royal Marine Artillery
Capt. Edward Henry Fitzhardinge Heaton-Ellis 
Capt. Thomas Henry Heming
Engineer Capt. William Fryer Hinchcliffe 
Paymaster Commander John Dickenson Holmes 
Temp Lt.-Col. the Hon. Cuthbert James, Royal Marines
Chaplain and Instructor Commander the Rev. Percy Herbert Jones 
Chaplain and Instructor Commander the Rev. Robert McKew
Paymaster Capt. Charles Edward Hughes Meredyth 
Engineer Capt. Herbert Brooks Moorshead
Paymaster Capt. William George Edward Penfold 
Engineer Capt. John David Rees
Engineer Capt. Ernest William Rodet 
Capt. Frank Edward Cavendish Ryan  (Rear-Admiral, retired)
Paymaster Capt. Ernest Edwin Silk 
Engineer Capt. George Thomas Simmons 
Capt. Morris Henry Smyth  (Vice-Admiral, retired)
Engineer Capt. Lindsay James Stephens
Engineer Capt. Charles Stevens 
Engineer Capt. John Greet Stevens 
Capt. Arthur Trevelyan Taylor
Capt. Leicester Francis Gartside Tippinge 
Engineer Capt. Albert Edward Tompkins 
Capt. Francis Loftus Tottenham
Maj. Arthur Gustave Vincent, Royal Marine Light Infantry
Paymaster Capt. Charles Henry Allem Ward 
Capt. John Alexander Webster 
Paymaster Commander Charles Scrivener Wonham 
Capt. William Bourchier Sherard Wrey 
Capt. Fred W. Young 

For valuable services rendered in connection with the War —
Army
Col. Archibald John Chapman  Royal Dublin Fusiliers
Col. Hugh Montgomerie Sinclair  Royal Engineers
Lt.-Col. Harry Gilbert Barling  Royal Army Medical Corps
Maj. and Bt. Lt.-Col. David Forster  Royal Engineers
Temp Maj. and Bt. Lt.-Col. Woodbine Parish
Maj. James Swain  Royal Army Medical Corps
Col. Hugh Robert Adair
Col. Gofton Gee Adams
Maj. and Bt. Lt.-Col. Lewis Charles Adams, Royal Artillery
Lt.-Col. Robert Hay Adamson, Royal Garrison Artillery
Rev. Josiah George Alford  Royal Army Chaplains' Department
Col. Thomas Graves Lowry Herbert Armstrong
Temp Lt.-Col. Sir Robert Armstrong-Jones  Royal Army Medical Corps
Maj. Andrew Aytoun  Argyll and Sutherland Highlanders
Col. Alfred John Bailey 
Temp Maj. Robert Leatham Barclay  Norfolk Yeomanry
Maj. and Bt. Lt.-Col. Hon Everard Baring  10th Hussars
Lt.-Col. Frederick George Barker
Temp Maj. John Barrett-Lennard
Lt.-Col. and Bt. Col. Stanley Leonard Barry  Northamptonshire Regiment
Col. Alfred Yarker Barton
Lt.-Col. Reginald Cossley Batt  Royal Fusiliers
Col. Frederick Baylay
Maj. and Bt. Lt.-Col. Arthur George Bayley  Oxfordshire and Buckinghamshire Light Infantry
Capt. and Bt. Lt.-Col. Roger Hammet Beadon, Royal Army Service Corps
Capt. Sir Frank Beauchamp  Royal Army Service Corps
Lt.-Col. Andrew Cracroft Beoher, Norfolk Regiment
Temp Maj. Frank Bedford-Glasier 
Maj. Sydney Belfield, Royal Artillery
Lt.-Col. William Kingsmill Bernard, Royal Army Service Corps
Rev. Monsignor Francis Bickerstaffe-Drew  Royal Army Chaplains' Department
Capt. and Bt. Maj. Hon Charles Clive Bigham  Grenadier Guards
Temp Lt.-Col. Lawson Billington, Royal Engineers
Lt.-Col. George Christopher McDowall Birdwood, Rem. Service
Col. William Cuthbert Blackett 
Lt.-Col. Laurence James Blandford  Royal Army Medical Corps
Lt.-Col. Thomas Gordon Cumming Bliss, Army Pay Department
Lt.-Col. Charles Jasper Blunt, Royal Army Ordnance Corps
Lt.-Col. James Blyth, Oxfordshire and Buckinghamshire Light Infantry
Maj. and Bt. Lt.-Col. George Orlebar Boase, Royal Artillery
Lt.-Col. Dennis Fortescue Boles  3rd Devonshire Regiment
Capt. George Edward N-ussey Booker, Res. R. Cav
Lt.-Col. and Bt. Col. Joseph Ignatius Bonomi, South Lancashire Regiment
Maj. William Arthur Travell Bowly 
Col. Mossom Archibald Boyd
Temp Maj. and Bt. Lt.-Col. Frederick Sadlier Brereton, Royal Army Medical Corps
Col. Walter Bromilow
Maj. and Bt. Col. Ronald George Brooke  3rd Res. Cav. Regiment
Maj. and Bt. Lt.-Col. William George Charteris Brown, Royal Engineers (dated 24 May 1919)
Bt. Col. Abraham Walker Browne, Royal Army Medical Corps
Col. Charles William Brownlow  Royal Artillery
Maj. Clarence Dalrymple Bruce, West Riding Regiment
Maj. and Bt. Lt.-Col. Frederick Carkeet Bryant  Royal Artillery
Lt.-Col. Charles Forbes Buchan
Capt. Cuthbert Buckle, Royal Garrison Artillery
Temp Lt.-Col. George Alexander MacLean Buckley  
Col. Rowland Burdon 
Col. John Francis Burn-Murdoch 
Lt.-Col. and Bt. Col. Rainald Owen Burne, Royal Army Service Corps
Col. Herbert Henry Burney 
Temp Lt.-Col. Sir Merrik Raymond Burrell, Rem. Service
Lt.-Col. and Bt. Col. Edmund Augustine Burrows  Royal Artillery
Col. Henry Hugh Butler, late Royal Artillery
Col. William John Bythell, Royal Engineers
Lt.-Col. Harry Ernest Cadell, Royal Artillery
Temp Capt. Norman Macleod Buchan, Earl of Caithness, Gordon Highlanders
Col. Thomas Charles Pleydell Calley 
Lt.-Col. James Calvert  Royal Army Medical Corps
Maj. and Bt. Lt.-Col. Hon Ralph Alexander Campbell, Lovat's Scouts Yeomanry
Col. William MacLaren Campbell 
Lt.-Col. and Bt. Col. George Hereward Gardew  Royal Army Service Corps
Temp Col. Albert Carless  Army Medical Service
Col. Montgomery Launcelot Carleton
Col. Edward Elliot Carr 
Col. Charles Herbert Philip Carter 
Lt.-Col. and Bt. Col. Ernest Augustus Frederick Carter, Royal Lancaster Regiment
Lt.-Col. George Harrison Champion de Crespigny, late Northamptonshire Regiment
Temp Col. Sir Arthur Chance  Army Medical Service
Lt.-Col. Frank Beauchamp Macaulay Chatterton  Royal Army Service Corps
Hon Brig. Gen. Hugh Cecil Cholmondeley  Shropshire T.F.A
Temp Maj. Herman Clarke, Royal Engineers
Temp Capt. Ernest Charles Clay  
Hon Col. Ernest Thomas Clifford  Royal Engineers
Col. Waiter Rees Clifford
Maj. Herbert Cleeve, Royal Army Service Corps
Lt.-Col. George Cockburn  late Rifle Brigade
Lt.-Col. and Bt. Col. Hugh Fortescue Coleridge  Middlesex Regiment
Lt.-Col. Alexander Arthur Lysons Collard, Army Pay Department
Col. Arthur William Collard
Lt.-Col. Forrester Farnell Colvin, 2nd Dragoons
Col. Gwynnedd Conway Gordon, late Royal Army Service Corps
Col. Harry Cooper 
Lt.-Col. and Bt. Col. Reginald James Cope Cottell, Royal Army Medical Corps
Capt. Arthur George Cousins, London Regiment
Maj. Edward Geoffrey Hippisley Cox, London Regiment
Temp Lt.-Col. Maurice Craig  Royal Army Medical Corps
Lt.-Col. Robert Anneeley Craig  Royal Artillery
Lt.-Col. and Bt. Col. Philip John Ribton Crampton, late Royal Artillery
Lt.-Col. Edmund Henry Bertram Craster, Royal Garrison Artillery
Col. Cyril Randell Crofton-Atkins
Rev. William Thomas Rupert Crookham, Royal Army Chaplains' Department
Col. Montagu Creighton Curry 
Col. George Glencairn Cunningham  late Royal Scots
Col. Frederick Francis Williamson Daniell
Col. Edmund William Dashwood
Lt.-Col. and Bt. Col. Richard Woodforde Deane, late Staff
Lt.-Col. Cecil de Courcy Etheridge  East Yorkshire Regiment
Col. Sir James de Hoghton 
Lt.-Col. and Bt. Col. William Grant de Jersey, late Royal Artillery
Maj. and Bt. Lt.-Col. Herman Gaston de Watteville, Royal Artillery
Col. Henry Denison 
Maj. and Bt. Lt.-Col. John Crampton Morton Doran  Royal Army Service Corps
Lt.-Col. Vickers Dunfee, London Regiment
Lt.-Col. and Bt. Col. William Dunne  late Royal Army Service Corps
Maj. Philip George Easton  Royal Army Medical Corps
Quartermaster and Lt.-Col. James Heslam Edmondson, Royal Army Service Corps
Lt.-Col. Henry John Edwards 
Temp Maj. William Bickerton Edwards  Royal Army Medical Corps
Col. Michael Henry Egan 
Col. Charles Conyngham Ellis 
Henrietta Christobel Ellis  Commandant, Women's Legion
Christiana Deanes Elmslie  Matron, Queen Alexandra's Imperial Military Nursing Service Reserve
Lt.-Col. Harold Carleton Wetherall Eteson, Royal Artillery
Maj. and Bt. Lt.-Col. Arthur Spenser Loat Farquharson, Officers Training Corps, Oxford University
Brig. Gen. Robert Black Fell 
Capt. and Bt. Maj. Edward Hurry Fenwick  Royal Army Medical Corps
Maj. and Bt. Lt.-Col. Henry Minchin Ferrar, Rem. Service
Lt.-Col. Hamilton Walter Edward Finch  Middlesex Regiment
Maj. and Bt. Lt.-Col. Harold Findlay, East Kent Regiment
Lt.-Col. Herbert Mayow Fisher-Rowe, Surrey Yeomanry
Maj. and Bt. Lt.-Col. Ernest Richard Fitzpatrick  North Lancashire Regiment
Lt.-Col. Sir William Charles de Meuron Wentworth-Fitzwilliam, Earl Fitzwilliam  West Riding Royal Horse Artillery
Lt.-Col. Frank Wigram Foley  Royal Berkshire Regiment
Lt.-Col. Henry Spencer Follett, 7th Dragoon Guards
Lt.-Col. Alfred James Foster  Northumberland Fas
Temp Maj. Arthur Bruce Foster
Maj. and Bt. Lt.-Col. Henry Needham Foster  Royal Army Service Corps
Temp Lt.-Col. Charles John Francis, Royal Engineers
Lt.-Col. John Pilling Fraser  Royal Engineers
Lt.-Col. Herbert French  Royal Army Medical Corps
Maj. and Bt. Lt.-Col. Cyril Halsted Frith, Oxfordshire and Buckinghamshire Light Infantry 
Maj. Charles James Hookham Gardner, Yorkshire Regiment
Lt.-Col. Arthur Newson Bruff Garrett, Shropshire Light Infantry
Col. John Samuel Gaussen, Army Pay Department
Lt.-Col. George Hessing Geddes  Royal Artillery
Lt.-Col. and Bt. Col. Archibald Burns Gemmel, Royal Army Medical Corps
Col. Arthur Robert Gilbert 
Col. Frederick Charles Almon Gilpin 
Maj. Joseph Henry Russell Bailey, Lord Glanusk  Grenadier Guards
Col. John William Godfray 
Temp Hon Lt.-Col. Mervyn Henry Gordon  Royal Army Medical Corps
Col. Charles Steward Gordon-Steward
Temp Capt. Ronald Gorell Barnes, Lord Gorell  
Col. Edmund Howard Gorges 
Maj. Alan Percy George Gough  late Denbigh Hussars
Lt.-Col. Sir Alfred Pearce Gould  Royal Army Medical Corps
Capt. Gilbert Maxwell Adair Graham  
Maj. John Henry Maitland Greenly, Herefordshire Regiment
Lt.-Col. Robert Alexander Greg, Cheshire Regiment
Lt.-Col. John Gretton  North Staffordshire Regiment
Maj. and Bt. Lt.-Col. Walter Harold Gribbon  Royal Lancaster Regiment
Col. Edward Aickin William Stewart Grove 
Col. Frederick Hacket-Thompson 
Col. Robert Isaa Dalby Hackett  Royal Army Medical Corps
Ven. Archdeacon Henry Armstrong Hall, Royal Army Chaplains' Department
Maj. Sir John Richard Hall  Irish Guards
Maj. and Bt. Lt.-Col. Harold Everard Hambro, Rem. Service, late Royal Artillery
Col. Arthur Francis Hamilton-Cox, Army Pay Department
Maj. and Bt. Lt.-Col. Frederick Dawson Hammond  Royal Engineers
Maj. John Cyril Giffard Alers Hankey  Royal Artillery
Maj. and Bt. Lt.-Col. Charles Tristram Melville Hare, Leicestershire Regiment
Lt.-Col. and Bt. Col. Louis Kenneth Harrison  Royal Army Medical Corps
Lt.-Col. and Hon Col. Charles Joseph Hart  late Royal Warwickshire Regiment
Lt.-Col. David Harvey  Royal Army Medical Corps
Lt.-Col. and Bt. Col. Herbert Pennell Hawkins, Royal Army Medical Corps
Lt.-Col. Kenneth Edward Haynes  Royal Artillery
Maj. Charles Henry Brabazon Heaton-Ellis, Bedfordshire Regiment
Temp Lt. John Percival Helliwell
Col. Hon Walter George Hepburne-Scott, Master of Polwarth  Royal Scots
Hon Brig. Gen. Thomas Heron  Royal Army Ordnance Corps
Lt.-Col. Rawdon John Isherwood Hesketh, Royal Fusiliers
Maj. and Bt. Lt.-Col. Robert Knox Hezlet  Royal Artillery
Maj. Charles Henry Hill  York and Lancaster Regiment 
Temp Lt.-Col. Francis Robert Hill  Royal Army Medical Corps
Lt.-Col. Robert Montague Hill, Royal Garrison Artillery
Temp Maj. Walter de Marchet Hill, Royal Army Medical Corps
Maj. Ectmond Herbert Hills  late Royal Engineers
Jane Hoadley  Matron Queen Alexandra's Imperial Military Nursing Service
Bt. Lt.-Col. Sir George Lindsay Holford  late 1st Life Guards
Maj. and Bt. Lt.-Col. Hardress Gilbert Holmes  Yorkshire Regiment
Rev. Arthur Venables Calvely Hordern  Royal Army Chaplains' Department
Emilie Hilda Horniblow  Chief Controller, Queen Mary's Army Auxiliary Corps
Maj. John Cunningham Moore Hoskyn  Indian Army
Lt.-Col. Francis James Leigh Howard  Royal Army Service Corps
Lt.-Col. and Bt. Col. Randall Charles Annesley Lowe  York and Lancaster Regiment
Col. John James Francis Hume
Lt.-Col. and Bt. Col. Godfrey Massy Vere Hunt, Royal Army Service Corps
Col. Edgar Assheton Iremonger, late Durham Light Infantry
Lt.-Col. Archibald Jack, Royal Engineers
Temp Maj. Frederick James, Royal Army Service Corps
Rev. Canon Sidney Rhodes James, Royal Army Chaplains' Department
Col. Noble Fleming Jenkins 
Lt.-Col. Edward Charles Jennings, Royal Fusiliers
Lt.-Col. Augustus George Aimes Jerrard, Somerset Light Infantry
Col. Henry Halcro Johnston  late Royal Army Medical Corps
Col. Osmond Moncrieff Johnston, late Army Pay Department
Lt.-Col. and Bt. Col. Hope Johnstone, Royal Artillery
Temp Lt.-Col. Cyril Vivian Jones, Royal Army Service Corps
Maj.-Gen. Oliver Richard Archer Julian  Army Medical Service
Maj. Richard Henry Keane  
Temp Lt.-Col. Charles Leslie Kempton, Royal Engineers
Lt.-Col. and Bt. Col. Henry Gerard Hegan Kennard, 5th Dragoon Guards
Lt.-Col. Edmund Gibbs Kimber  London Regiment
Col. Charles Dickson King, late Royal Artillery
Maj. John Charles Kirk  Royal Field Artillery
Lt.-Col. Ivone Kirkpatrick, late South Staffordshire Regiment
Lt.-Col. and Bt. Col. Lancelot Charles Koe, late Royal Garrison Artillery
Col. William Henry Land 
Lt.-Col. and Bt. Col. Samuel Wellington Lane, Royal Artillery
Lt.-Col. and Bt. Col. John Penrice Langley, Royal Artillery
Maj. Reginald Nesbitt Wingfield Larking, late Scots Guards
Col. Harold Pemberton Leach  Royal Engineers
Lt.-Col. Kenneth John Walters Leather, Durham Light Infantry, Special Reserve
Col. Francis Lee
Lt.-Col. Charles Archibald Lees, Royal Army Medical Corps
Maj. and Bt. Lt.-Col. Alfred Digby Legard, King's Royal Rifle Corps
Capt. Henry Gordon Leith, Northumberland Yeomanry
Lt.-Col. Edward Thomas Le Marchant, Royal Fusiliers
Temp Lt.-Col. Gerald MacLean Lemonius, Liverpool Regiment
Lt.-Col. and Bt. Col. Frederick Amelius Le Poer Trench  Royal Army Service Corps
Lt.-Col. Sir John Leslie  Royal Irish Fusiliers
Maj. Cecil Bingham Levita  Royal Horse Artillery
Maj. and Bt. Lt.-Col. Clive Gerard Liddell  Leicestershire Regiment
Col. Malcolm Orme Little 
Maj. and Bt. Col. Samuel Eyre Massy Lloyd, Suffolk Regiment
Lt.-Col. Charles John Lloyd-Carson, East Lancashire Regiment 
Temp Lt.-Col. John Robert Lord  Royal Army Medical Corps
Col. Alfred Crowdy Lovett  (dated 26 May 1919)
Col. James Lowry, Army Pay Department
Col. Edmund Ranald Owen Ludlow  Royal Army Service Corps
Maj. and Bt. Lt.-Col. Arthur Pearson Luff  Royal Army Medical Corps
Lt.-Col. and Bt. Col. Hugh Thomas Lyle  Royal Welsh Fusiliers
Capt. and Bt. Lt.-Col. David Lynch, Rem. Service
Col. Barklie Cairns McCalmont 
Maj. Robert Arthur McClymont  Royal Artillery
Lt.-Col. Edwin Millar Gilliland McFerran, Royal Irish Rifles
Col. Robert Campbell McKenzie 
Temp Maj. and Hon Lt.- Corporal John McKie  
Hon Col. Alfred Donald Mackintosh of Mackintosh
Col. George Mackintosh 
Rev. Ewen George Fitzroy Macpherson  Royal Army Chaplains' Department
Col. Charles John Markham
Col. John Marriott 
Lt.-Col. and Bt. Col. Frank Marsh  Royal Army Medical Corps
Lt.-Col. Ernest Edmund Martin  Royal Army Veterinary Corps
Lt.-Col. James Fitzgerald Martin  Royal Army Medical Corps
Col. Henry Marwood
Lt.-Col. and Bt. Col. David James Mason-MacFarlane  Seaforth Highlanders
Lt.-Col. and Bt. Col. Percy Hugh Hamon Massy
Lt.-Col. Francis Richard Maunsell  late Royal Artillery
Col. Charles Stuart Meeres  late Royal Artillery
Lt.-Col. James Austen Meldon, Royal Dublin Fusiliers
Maj. Robert Ramsden Mellor, Special Reserve
Maj.-Bertram Metcalfe-Smith
Maj. and Bt. Lt.-Col. Henry Andrew Micklem  Royal Engineers
Maj. and Bt. Lt.-Col. William Crawfurd Middleton, Rem. Service
Temp Lt.-Col. George Edward Miles, Royal Army Medical Corps
Lt.-Col. and Bt. Col. Hugh de Burgh Miller  Royal Artillery
Col. Edward Montagu
Col. Arthur Trevelyan Moore, Royal Engineers
Lt.-Col. and Bt. Col. Robert Reginald Heber Moore  Royal Army Medical Corps
Col. William Moore-Lane, Royal Army Ordnance Corps
Lt.-Col. AlexanderBraithwaite Morgan, Army Pay Department
Maj. and Bt. Lt.-Col. Edward Morton, Cheshire Regiment
Lt.-Col. and Bt. Col. Charles William Mansell Moullin  Royal Army Medical Corps
Col. George Herbert Muller 
Rev. William Murphy, Royal Army Chaplains' Department
Lt.-Col. Eric Madden Murray, Army Pay Department
Maj. and Bt. Lt.-Col. Arthur Murray-Smith, Royal Garrison Artillery
Col. Edgar Forbes Nelson
Lt.-Col. Edward John Neve, Army Pay Department
Col. Edmund Wcoitt Newland, Army Pay Department
Temp Maj. Herbert Niblett  Royal Army Service Corps
Maj. and Bt. Lt.-Col. Louis Hemington Noblett, Royal Irish Rifles
Maj. and Bt. Lt.-Col. Alan Ian Percy, Duke of Northumberland  Grenadier Guards
Maj. and Bt. Lt.-Col. Walter Vyvian Nugent  Royal Artillery
Col. Edmund Donough John O'Brien 
Temp Col. Joseph Francis O'Carrol  Army Medical Service
Lt.-Col. and Bt. Col. Montague Ernest O'Donoghue, late Indian Army
Col. Tom Evelyn O'Leary 
Rev. Richard John Deane Oliver  Royal Army Chaplains' Department
Lt.-Col. John Kevin O'Meagher, late Royal Munster Fusiliers
Lt.-Col. Cranley Charlton Onslow  Bedfordshire Regiment
Lt.-Col. Francis George Rodney Ostrehan, Indian Army
Col. Daniel O'Sullivan, Army Medical Service
Temp Maj. William Hugh Owen, Royal Engineers
Lt.-Col. and Bt. Col. Robert Leonce Owens, Royal Irish Regiment
Maj. and Bt. Lt.-Col. Clements Parr, late Oxfordshire and Buckinghamshire Light Infantry
Maj. and Bt. Lt.-Col. Henry Jules Parry  Royal Army Medical Corps
Lt.-Col. Llewelyn England Sidney Parry  Denbigh Yeomanry
Temp Col. John Herbert Parsons  Army Medical Service
Temp Lt.-Col. Andrew Melville Paterson  Royal Army Medical Corps (dated 12 February 1919)
Col. Stanley Paterson
Rev. Charles Alfred Peacock  Royal Army Chaplains' Department
Lt.-Col. Cyril Harvey Pearee, Yorkshire Regiment
Lt.-Col. George Thomson Pearson, Royal Field Artillery
Col. Charles Cecil Perceval, Royal Engineers
Col. Edwin King Perkins 
Temp Lt.-Col. Hugh Wharton Perkins  
Temp Maj. and Bt. Lt.-Col. George Ingleton Phillips, Royal Warwickshire Regiment
Lt.-Col. Cuthbert Joseph Pike, Duke of Cornwall's Light Infantry
Lt.-Col. Henry Quinten Pinhorn, Army Pay Department
Lt.-Col. Edward Abadie Plunkett, Lincolnshire Regiment
Maj. Arthur Faulconer Poulton, Royal Army Service Corps
Maj. and Bt. Lt.-Col. Philip Lionel William Powell  Welsh Regiment
Col. Theodore John Warrender Prendergast, Royal Engineers
Rev. Edward Herbert Pulling, Royal Army Chaplains' Department
Lt.-Col. John Spottiswoode Purvis, Royal Engineers
Temp Maj. Henry Stanley Raper, Royal Engineers
Lt.-Col. Sir James Farquharson Remnant  Royal Army Service Corps
Gertrude Mary Richards  Matron, Queen Alexandra's Imperial Military Nursing Service
Lt.-Col. and Bt. Col. Arthur Noel Roberts, late Royal Army Service Corps
Lt.-Col. and Bt. Col. Henry Robert Roberts, late Lincolnshire Regiment
Lt.-Col. Lancelot William Rolleston  Royal Army Medical Corps
Col. Alexander William Roper  Royal Engineers
Temp Hon Lt.-Col. Richard Gundry Rows  Royal Army Medical Corps
Maj. and Bt. Lt.-Col. Morris Boscawen Savage  South Staffordshire Regiment
Maj. Charles Edward Sawyer, late North Lancashire Regiment
Lt.-Col. and Bt. Col. George Peabody Scholfield  Royal Engineers
Rev. William John Selby, Royal Army Chaplains' Department
Col. Sir Anthony Ashley-Cooper, Earl of Shaftesbury 
Hon Col. Sir Walter Geoffrey Shakerley 
Maj. and Bt. Lt.-Col. Charles Shawe, Rifle Brigade
Temp Col. James Sherren  Royal Army Medical Corps
Anne Beadsmore Smith  Principal Matron, Queen Alexandra's Imperial Military Nursing Service
Lt.-Col. Peter Caldwell Smith, Royal Army Medical Corps
Maj. and Bt. Col. James William Smith-Keill, Scots Guards
Lt.-Col. and Bt. Col. Walter Charles Smithson  late 13th Hussars
Col. Robert Napier Smyth 
Margaret Elwin Sparshott  Territorial Force Nursing Service
Capt. and Bt. Lt.-Col. Edward Louis Spiers  11th Hussars
Col. James Rawdon Stansfeld  late Royal Artillery
Temp Hon Lt.-Col. Thomas Edward Knowles Stansfield  Royal Army Medical Corps
Lt.-Col. John Frederick Stenning  Unattd. List
Maj. and Bt. Lt.-Col. Patrick Alexander Vansitart Stewart  King's Own Scottish Borderers
Col. William Robert Stewart  late Royal Engineers
Maj. and Bt. Lt.-Col. George Herbert Stobart  Royal Field Artillery
Temp Maj. Robert John Stordy  Royal Army Veterinary Corps
Lt.-Col. George Edward John Mowbray Rous, Earl of Stradbroke  Royal Field Artillery
Maj. Edward Lisle Strutt  Royal Scots
Lt.-Col. Ernest Frederic Sulivan, East Surrey Regiment
Maj. George Kilner Swettenham  Royal Irish Rifles
Maj. Charles Newton Taylor, London Regiment
Temp Maj. Harold Blake Taylor, Royal Engineers
Col. Sir Godfrey Vignoles Thomas  (dated 16 February 1919)
Maj. and Bt. Lt.-Col. Reginald Aneurin Thomas, Royal Artillery
Maj. Christopher Birdwood Thomson  Royal Engineers
Temp Lt.-Col. David George Thqfrnson  Royal Army Medical Corps
Lt.-Col. Charles Mytton Thornycroft  Manchester Regiment
Lt.-Col. and Bt. Col. Hayford Douglas Thorold, late West Riding Regiment
Col. Willoughby Thuillier
Lt.-Col. Norman Eccles Tilney  Royal Field Artillery
Col. Octavius Todd  late Royal Army Medical Corps
Col. Francis William Towsey 
Capt. and Bt. Maj. Guy Elliston Toynbee  Royal Army Service Corps
Maj. Philip Christian William Trevor, Royal Army Ordnance Corps
Maj. William Kington Tucker  Royal Army Service Corps
Rev. James Grove White Tuckey  Royal Army Chaplains' Department
Col. Archer Lloyd Marischal Turner
Col. John Henry Twiss  late Royal Engineers
Col. Charles Robert Tyrrell  late Royal Army Medical Corps
Maj. and Bt. Lt.-Col. Henry Martley Vandeleur, Royal Artillery
Col. Casimir Henry Claude Van Straubenzee 
Lt.-Col. Sir Charles Cheers Wakefield  Royal Garrison Artillery
Lt.-Col. Francis Spring Walker  Royal Army Medical Corps
Lt.-Col. Montagu Charles Pearson Ward, Royal Artillery
Capt. and Bt. Maj. Thomas Richard Pennefather Warren, Royal Army Service Corps
Lt.-Col. Fredric Mostyn Watkins, Army Pay Department
Maj. and Bt. Lt.-Col. Bromley George Vere Way  Nottinghamshire and Derbyshire Regiment
Col. John Sutton Edward Western, Indian Army
Col. Claude Beruers Westmacott 
Lt.-Col. Sinclair White  Royal Army Medical Corps
Maj. Francis Vernon Willey  Nottinghamshire Yeomanry
Lt.-Col. Arthur Cecil Williams  Royal Artillery
Maj. and Bt. Lt.-Col. Henry Benfield Des Voeux Wilkinson, late Durham Light Infantry
Lt.-Col. and Bt. Col. John George Yule Wilson, Royal Army Service Corps
Lt.-Col. Henry Edward Disbrowe Wise, Nottinghamshire and Derbyshire Regiment
Col. Hastings St. Leger Wood 
Lt.-Col. Arthur Stanley Woodwark  Royal Army Medical Corps
Col. Ernest Granville Wright
Col. George Wright 
Temp Capt. William Burgess Wright 
Col. Archibald Young 
Temp Lt.-Col. David Douglas Young
Temp Maj. Patrick Charles Young  Royal Engineers

Canadian Forces
Col. John George Adam, Canadian Army Medical Corps
Rev. Canon John MacPherson Almond  Canadian Army Chaplains' Department
Col. John Alexander Armstrong  Canadian Army Dental Corps
Capt. Samuel Medbury Bosworth, Quebec Regiment
Col. James Whiteside Bridges, Canadian Army Medical Corps
Lt.-Col. Ernest Rudolf Brown, Canadian Army Medical Corps
Lt.-Col. William Senkler Buell, C.E.F.
Col. Perry Gladstone Goldsmith, Canadian Army Medical Corps
Col. James Alexander Hutchison, Canadian Army Medical Corps
Temp Col. Walter McKeown, Canadian Army Medical Corps
Col. Herman Melchior Robertson, Canadian Army Medical Corps
Lt.-Col. Charles Millidge Ruttan, Canadian Army Service Corps
Col. Frederick St. Duthus Skinner, Reserve of Officers
Lt.-Col. John Spottiswood Tait, British Columbia Regiment

Australian Imperial Forces
Col. Samuel Henry Egerton Barraclough, Military Forces Staff
Ethel Sarah Davidson  Matron, Australian Army Nursing Service
Ethel Gray  Matron, Australian Army Nursing Service
Rev. Albert Thomas Holden  Australian Army Chaplains' Department
Adelaide Maud Kellett  Matron, Australian Army Nursing Service
Col. George Merrick Long
Col. Reginald Jeffrey Millard  Australian Army Medical Corps
Lt.-Col. George Wall  
Rev. Frederick William Wray  Australian Army Chaplains' Department

New Zealand Forces
Lt.-Col. Hugh Thomas Dyke Acland  NZ Medical Corps
Lt.-Col. Anderson Carberry Robert Dillon  NZ Medical Corps
Col. James McNaughton Christie
Col. Percival Robert Cooke
Col. Charles James Cooper 
Maj. and Temp Lt.-Col. Thomas Henry Dawson  Auckland Regiment
Lt.-Col. Alexander Robertson Falconer, NZ Medical Corps
Lt.-Col. George Edward Gabites, NZ Medical Corps
Lt.-Col. George Thompson Hall 
Col. Ernest Haviland Hiley
Col. John Edward Hume
Lt.-Col. and Temp Col. James William Hutchen 
Lt.-Col. John Patrick Daunt Leahy, NZ Medical Corps
Col. Charles Thomas Maj. 
Lt.-Col. Robert Haldane Makgill, NZ Medical Corps
Temp Col. Thomas Mill 
Lt.-Col. Herbert Edward Pilkington, NZ Artillery
Col. David Pringle 
Col. James Robert Purdy 
Col. Charles John Reakes
Col. John Ranken Reed 
Lt.-Col. Alexander Fowler Roberts  NZ Forces
Lt.-Col. James Herbert Graham Robertson, NZ Medical Corps
Lt.-Col. James Lewis Sleeman, NZ Forces
Col. Edmund Robinson Smith 
Col. William James Strong 
Maj. and Temp Lt.-Col. John Studholme  Canterbury Mounted Rifles
Mabel Thurston  Matron-in-Chief, NZ Army Nursing Service
Col. Thomas Harcourt Ambrose Valintine
Col. Gerard Arnold Ward
Col. David Storer Wylie 

South African Forces
Temp Lt.-Col. Charles Roscoe Burgess  
Maj. and Bt. Lt.-Col. Robert Richard Edwards, Perm. Staff
Col. Frederick Arthur Hodson, North Rhodesia Police
Temp Maj. and Bt. Lt.-Col. James Mitchell Baker  Staff
Col. Philip Graham Stock  SA Army Medical Corps

Newfoundland Forces
Maj. Alexander Montgomerie  H.Q. Staff, Newfoundland

Civil Division

British India
George Francis Adams, Chief Inspector of Mines in India
Eric Oswald Anderson, Member of the Council of the Lt.-Governor, Burma
Denys de Saumarez Bray  Indian Civil Service, Officiating Secretary to the Government of India, Foreign! Department
Denis Calnan, Indian Civil Service, Commissioner, Agra Division, United Provinces
Henry Venn Cobb  Resident in Mysore and Chief Commissioner, Coorg
Alexander Cochran  Calcutta
Adela Cottle  St. John Ambulance Association, Calcutta
Frances Henrietta, Lady Craddock, Vice President, Burma Joint War Committee
Honorary Maj. Arthur Da Vies, Honorary Superintendent, St. John's and British Red Cross Combined War Gifts Depot, Bombay
Maharaja Ramanuj Saran Singh Deo, Feudatory Chief of Surguja State, Central Provinces
Constance, Lady Fraser  Hyderabad, (Deccan)
Lewis French  Indian Civil Service, Additional Secretary to the Government of the Punjab
Hugh Kirkwood Gracey, Indian Civil Service, Commissioner, Gorakhpur Division United Provinces
Egbert Laurie Lucas Hammond, Indian Civil Service, Controller of Munitions, Bihar and Orissa
John Wright Henderson, Representative of the War Office in India for hides
Edwin John Agra, United Provinces
Jalal-ud-Daula, Nawab Muhammad Khurished
Ali Khan, Bahadur, Mustakil-i-Jang, of Dujana, Punjab
Maj. Sir Malik Umar Hayat Khan  Tiwana of Kalra, Shahpur District, Punjab
William King-Wood, Director, Indo-European Telegraph Department, Persian Section
Arthur Rowland Knapp, Indian Civil Service, Secretary to Government Revenue Department, Madras
Charles Gerrans Leftwich, Indian Civil Service, Director of Civil Supplies, Central Provinces
Francis Legge, Deputy Coal Controller, Bengal
Harry Alexander Fanshawe Lindsay, Indian Civil Service, Director-Gen. of Commercial Intelligence in India
Sir Leslie Creery Miller  Indian Civil Service (retired), Chief Judge, Mysore State
Maharaja Bahadur Keshav Prashad Singh, of Dumraon, Bihar and Orissa
Arthur Preston, Honorary Secretary, Indian Soldiers Fund Committee
Lt.-Col. Cyril Powney Thompson, Indian Army, Commissioner, Multan, Punjab
Isabel Whitehead, in charge, Furlough Recreation Camp and Convalescent Camps, Nilgiris, Madras
George Charles Wolfe, Assistant Audit Officer, Military Supply Accounts

Commonwealth of Australia
John Adamson, formerly Member of the Legislative Assembly, Queensland

Dominion of New Zealand
Ethel Mary Burnett, for services in connection with the New Zealand War Contingent Association, London
James John Clark  Mayor of Dunedin, for services in connection with patriotic undertakings
Albert Cecil Day, Official Secretary to the Governor-General of New Zealand, for services to the New Zealand Government during the war
James Henry Gunson  Mayor of Auckland, for services in connection with patriotic undertakings
Henry Holland  Mayor of Christchurch, for services in connection with patriotic undertakings
Ronald Macintosh MacDonald, for services in connection with the New Zealand War Contingent Association, London
William Hugh Montgomery, for sendees as Assistant Director of Base Records in New Zealand
Iris Brenda Rolleston  for services in organising the Taumaru Hospital (Lowry Bay) for Wounded and Convalescent Soldiers, and for voluntary services as Matron

Union of South Africa
The Honourable Albert Browne  Joint Honorary Secretary, Governor-General's Fund
Penelope Louise Chappe  President, Durban Women's Patriotic League and Red Cross
James Stormont Dunn, Renter's Agent in South Africa
Lt.-Col. Godfrey Archibald Godley, for services in connection with the raising of the Native Labour Corps in South Africa
Major John Frederick Herbst, Secretary, South-West Protectorate
Arthur Tilney Long, Union Agent, Lourenço Marques
Deputy Commissioner William Manning, South African Police, Officer Commanding Prisoners of War Camp, Pietermaritzburg
James Howard Pirn, Chairman, Cost of Living Commission
Lewis Richardson, for services in connection with the Governor-General's Fund and Returned Soldiers

Newfoundland
Thomas Andrew Hall, Secretary to the Tonnage Committee and Ministry of Shipping and the Board of Coal Control
Edward Robert Morris, Member of the Newfoundland War Contingent Association in London
Mary Pitts, a Vice-President of the Women's Patriotic Association
Robert George Rendell  Chairman of the Military Service Committee
The Honourable Marmaduke George Winter, for services in connection with the Patriotic Association and as Chairman of the Committee dealing with Waterford Hall Convalescent Home

Crown Colonies, Protectorates, Etc.
John Ainsworth  Chief Native Commissioner, East Africa Protectorate Alma Baker, Founder of the Malayan Aircraft Fund
Edith Marion, Lady Bertram, President in Ceylon of Queen Mary's Needlework Guild
Charles Edward Boyes, Deputy Resident Commissioner for Basutoland, for services in recruiting labour
Alexander George Boyle  Lieutenant-Governor, and Officer Administering the Government, Nigeria
Arthur Frederick Church, Chief Engineer of the Uganda Railway
Arthur George Murchison Fletcher, Assistant Colonial Secretary and Clerk of Councils, and Chairman of Shipping Control Committee, Hong Kong
Alfred Claud Hollis  Secretary to the Administration
German East Africa
Martial Louis Auguste Noël, Registrar-General, Mauritius, for services as Food Controller and Controller of Exports
Arthur Meek Pountney, Treasurer, Straits Settlements
The Lady Frances Ryder, for services to the Overseas Forces
John Houston Sinclair  Chief Secretary to the Government, Zanzibar Protectorate
Denis Slyne, Receiver-General and Chairman of the Committee for winding up alien enemies estates, Trinidad
Winifred Marjory Stubbs, lately Vice-President in Ceylon, of Queen Mary's Needlework Guild
Marguerite Marie, Lady Wallace, for services in connection with War Funds, Northern Rhodesia

Honorary Commander
His Highness Omar bin Mohamed, Sultan of Witu

Officer of the Order of the British Empire (OBE)

Member of the Order of the British Empire (MBE)

Royal Red Cross (RRC)

First Class

Christina Cameron, Queen Alexandra's Imperial Military Nursing Service (Q.A.I.M.N.S) Reserve, Matron, Royal Air Force Nursing Service, Matlock
Lorna Margaret Holroyde, Matron, Royal Air Force Auxiliary Hospital, Eaton Square, London

In recognition of valuable services-with the British Forces in the Balkans —
Winifred Alice Attenborough  Asst. Matron, Territorial Force Nursing Service (T.F.N.S.)
Eva Catherine Ellis  Asst. Matron, Q.A.I.M.N.S.R.
Amy Louise Fielding, Acting Matron, Q.A.I.M.N.S.
Mary Elizabeth Mee, Acting Asst. Matron, T.F.N.S.
Sara Helen Mitchell, Acting Matron, T.F.N.S.
Maud Helena Weale, Matron, T.F.N.S.

Australian Army Nursing Service
Christense Sorensen  Sister, Temp Matron
Evelyn Clara Louisa Wilson, Sister, Temp Head Sister

In recognition of valuable services with the British Forces in Egypt —

Johanna McCarthy  Sister, Q.A.I.M.N.S.R.
Nannie Stewart, Sister, Q.A.I.M.N.S.R.
Emilie Elizabeth Wraxall  Sister, Q.A.I.M.N.S.R.

Australian Army Nursing Service
Jessie Ross Gemmel, Matron

In recognition of valuable services with the Armies in France and Flanders — 
Gertrude Alice Aitchison, Sister, Q.A.I.M.N.S. (Ret.)
Mary Ashlin-Thomas  Matron, British Red Cross Society
Pauline Barnard  Sister, T.F.N.S.
Marian Sabine Barwell  Acting Matron, Civilian Hospital, Special Reserve
Frances May Billington  Acting Sister, Q.A.I.M.N.S.R.
Mary Agnes Crawford Blair  Acting Sister, Q.A.I.M.N.S.R.
Maude Brasier  Matron, B.R.C.S.
Katherine Maud Bulman  Sister, Q.A.I.M.N.S. (Ret.)
Gertrude Mary Bulman  Sister in Charge, T.F.N.S.
Bessie Carley  Asst. Matron, T.F.N.S.
Rosylyn Mary Carr  Matron, B.R.C.S.
Annie Eleanor Casserley  Acting Sister, Civilian Hospital, Special Reserve
Elsie Violet Cassidy  Acting Sister, Civilian Hospital, Special Reserve
Grace Hardyman Caulfield  Acting Matron, Q.A.I.M.N.S.
Kate Eliza Jane Chapman, Sister in Charge, Q.A.I.M.N.S.R.
Mabel Adeline Chittock  Asst. Matron, St. John's Ambulance Brigade
Susannah Frances Davies  Asst. Matron, Q.A.I.M.N.S.
Ethel Isabella Devenish-Meares  Acting Matron, Q.A.I.M.N.S.R.
Emma Dodd  Sister, T.F.N.S.
Annie Duncan  Sister, Civilian Hospital, Special Reserve
Annie Harriett Esden  Asst. Matron, Q.A.I.M.N.S.
Helen Mary Fergusson  Sister, T.F.N.S.
Jessica Lillington Freshfield  Charge Sister, B.R.C.S.
Elsie Vera Orby Gascoigne  Acting Sister, Civilian Hospital, Special Reserve
Mabel Emily Gascoine  Acting Sister, Civilian Hospital, Special Reserve
Annice Gray  Acting Sister, Q.A.I.M.N.S.R.
Gladys Augusta Howe  Acting Matron, Q.A.I.M.N.S.
Mercy Huffer  Acting Sister, Civilian Hospital, Special Reserve
Mabel Jennings  Sister-in Charge, T.F.N.S.
Margaret Jane Jessop, Acting Sister, Civilian Hospital, Special Reserve
Nelly Ida Jordan  Asst. Matron, Q.A.I.M.N.S.
Marion Leppard  Acting Sister. Civilian Hospital, Special Reserve
Janet McFarlane Livingstone  Sister, Q.A.I.M.N.S.
Edith Maud Lyle  Sister, Asst. Matron, T.F.N.S.
Marion McCormick  Sister, Q.A.I.M.N.S.
Maude Alice Meeke  Sister, Q.A.I.M.N.S.R.
Martha. Reid-Morrison  Sister, T.F.N.S.
Kathleen Aloysius O'Reilly  Sister, Q.A.I.M.N.S.R.
Jane Jessie Arthur Paul  Sister, Q.A.I.M.N.S.R.
Edith Rose Pilson, Sister, T.F.N.S.
Mary Pool  Sister-in Charge, T.F.N.S.
Margaret Scott Ram, Matron, Q.A.I.M.N.S.
Jessie Anderson Robertson, Acting Sister, Civilian Hospital, Special Reserve
Christine Sandbach  Sister, Q.A.I.M.N.S.
Elizabeth Scott-Newton  Sister, Civilian Hospital, Special Reserve
Erne Robertson Sloan  Sister in Charge, T.F.N.S.
Agnes Martha Brownlie Taylor  Acting Sister, Civilian Hospital, Special Reserve
Lilian Mary Terrill  Sister, Q.A.I.M.N.S.R.
Jane Elizabeth Trotter  Acting Sister, Q.A.I.M.N.S.R.
Elizabeth Annie Williams, Acting Sister, Q.A.I.M.N.S.R.
Annie Paterson Wilson  Asst. Matron, Q.A.I.M.N.S.
Agnes Wyllie, Sister, Q.A.I.M.N.S.R.

Canadian Army Medical Corps
Sophia Mary Hoerner  Nursing Sister
Sarah Persis Johnson  Nursing Sister
Amy Emma MacMahon, Nursing Sister
Helen Lydia McIntosh, Nursing Sister
Emma Florence Pense  Acting Matron
Lucy Gertrude Squire  Acting Matron
Flora Harriet Wylie  Nursing Sister

Australian Army Nursing Service
Nellie Frances Hill, Sister
Eleanor Wibmer Jeffries  Head Sister
Constance Mabel Keys  Head Sister
Alice Joan Twynam, Head Sister

New Zealand Army Nursing Service
Blanche Marion Huddleston  Sister

In recognition of valuable services with the British Forces in Italy —
Mary Cockshott  Sister T.F.N.S.
Kathleen Mary Latham  Sister Q.A.I.M.N.S.R.
Mary Elizabeth Stewart  Matron, Q.A.I.M.N.S.

In recognition of valuable services with the British Forces in Mesopotamia —
Mary Meredith Bate  Asst. Matron, T.F.N.S.
Annie Constance Brumwell, Sister, Q.A.I.M.N.S.R.
Georgina Burke-Rioche  Matron, attd. Queen Alexandra's Medical Nursing Service India
Elizabeth Cooke, Sister, Q.A.I.M.N.S.R.
Dorothy Adeline Creed  Sister, Q.A.I.M.N.S.R.
Isobel Hay Drummond, Sister, Q.A.I.M.N.S.R.
Sophia Louisa Hatton  Sister, T.F.N.S.
Esther Isaac  Sister, Q.A.I.M.N.S.R.
Annie Leech  Sister, T.F.N.S.
Edith Osborne Marshall  Nursing Sister, Queen Alexandra's Medical Nursing Service India
Netta Louisa Sibley  Sister, Q.A.I.M.N.S.R.
Ethel Smithies, Sister, Q.A.I.M.N.S.R.
Magdalene Forbes Valentine, Sister, Q.A.I.M.N.S.R.
Dorothea West  Nursing Sister, Queen Alexandra's Medical Nursing Service India

In recognition of valuable services with the British Forces in East Africa —
Elizabeth Letita Kemsley  Acting Matron, East African Nursing Service
Mary MacDevitt  Nursing Sister, Q.A.I.M.N.S.R.
Florence Spindler, Matron, Nyasaland Medical Services

Second Class

In recognition of valuable nursing services in connection with the War — 
Annie Elizabeth Betts, Sister, Q.A.I.M.N.S.R. Military Hospital, Gibraltar
J. Edgar, Nurse-in-Charge, Convalescent Hospital, Waterford Bridge, Newfoundland
E. Reid, Nurse-in-Charge, Military Hospital St. John's, Newfoundland

In recognition of valuable services-with the British Forces in the Balkans —
Naomi Mildred Buckley, Sister, Q.A.I.M.N.S.R.
Annie Cameron, Staff Nurse, T.F.N.S.
Annie Clarke, Sister, Q.A.I.M.N.S.R.
Annora Cole, Staff Nurse, T.F.N.S.
Margaret Louise Dixon, Staff Nurse, Q.A.I.M.N.S.R.
Claudine Josephine Rose Douglas, Voluntary Aid Detachment
Mary Drury, Sister, T.F.N.S.
Irene Annie Duncan, Nurse, Spec. War Probationer
Ada Ellen Amelia Foreman, Sister, Q.A.I.M.N.S.R.
Gertrude Fozard, Staff Nurse, Q.A.I.M.N.S.R.
Margaret Hunter Gammie, Sister, T.F.N.S.
Helen. Gillespie, Sister, Q.A.I.M.N.S.R.
Nellie Barrowman Hutchison, Sister, Q.A.I.M.N.S.R.
Mary Maud Lilian Johns, Sister, Q.A.I.M.N.S.R.
Agnes Maguire, Staff Nurse, Q.A.I.M.N.S.R.
Elizabeth McVeigh, Staff Nurse, Q.A.I.M.N.S.R.
Annie Elizabeth Moffat, Sister, T.F.N.S.
Elizabeth Moore, Staff Nurse, Q.A.I.M.N.S.R.
Ada Isabel Murray, Sister, Q.A.I.M.N.S.R.
Harriett Powell-Evans, Sister, T.F.N.S.
Dora May Sempers, Sister, T.F.N.S.
Emily Simpson Shewan, Staff Nurse, T.F.N.S.
Kezia. Edith Stacey, Sister, Q.A.I.M.N.S.R.
Amelia Stevenson, Sister, T.F.N.S.
Annie Parker Thomson, Sister, Asst. Matron, T.F.N.S.
Mary Upton, Sister, T.F.N.S.
Evelyn Annie Williams, Sister, T.F.N.S.
Emmie Winkle, Sister, Q.A.I.M.N.S.R.

Australian Army Nursing Service
Ethel May Bolton, Sister, Temp Head Sister
Jean Brydon, Sister

In recognition of valuable services with the British Forces in Egypt —
Isobel Huntly Anderson, Sister, T.F.N.S.
Edith Lydia Arber, Sister, T.F.N.S.
Jane McLean Arnold, Sister, Q.A.I.M.N.S.R.
Gertrude Kate Berry, Sister, Q.A.I.M.N.S.R.
Agnes Broiwn, Sister, T.F.N.S.
Mary Graham Brownlee, Sister, T.F.N.S.
Elsie May Chiplin, Staff Nurse, T.F.N.S.
Florence Annie Cleve, Sister, Q.A.I.M.N.S.R.
Kathrene Ada Cole, Voluntary Aid Detachment, B.R.C.S.
Kathleen Lydia Conway, Sister, Q.A.I.M.N.S.R.
Christiana Dimmock, Sister, Q.A.I.M.N.S.R.
Fanny Eggington, Sister, T.F.N.S.
Alexa Ensor, Nurse, St. John's Ambulance Association
Elizabeth Forrester Farquhar, Staff Nurse, Q.A.I.M.N.S.R.
Euphemia Forrest, Sister, Q.A.I.M.N.S.R.
Alice Mary Funnell, Sister, Q.A.I.M.N.S.R.
Grace Gilfillan, Sister, Q.A.I.M.N.S.R.
Edith Athena Hancock, Sister, Q.A.I.M.N.S.R.
Mary Josephine Anna Hannan, Sister, Q.A.I.M.N.S.R.
Dorothy Hardwick, Voluntary Aid Detachment, B.R.C.S.
Jessie Harvey, Staff Nurse, T.F.N.S.
Alice Anne Heathcote, Staff Nurse, Q.A.I.M.N.S.R.
Alice Mary Hedges, Sister, Q.A.I.M.N.S.R.
Frances Lily Hoon, Sister, Q.A.I.M.N.S.R.
Grace Margaret Hooper, Sister, Q.A.I.M.N.S.R.
Elizabeth Grace Hutton, Sister, Q.A.I.M.N.S.R.
Dorothy Frances Jacob, Staff Nurse, Q.A.I.M.N.S.R.
Florence Caroline Jman, Staff Nurse, Q.A.I.M.N.S.R.
Flora MacDiarmid, Sister, Q.A.I.M.N.S.R.
Eliza MacDonald, Staff Nurse, Voluntary Aid Detachment
Emily Eliza Manser, Sister, Q.A.I.M.N.S.R.
Edith Marshall, Sister, Q.A.I.M.N.S.R.
Ethel Mary Maxwell, Nurse, St. John's Ambulance Association
Jessie Stewart McGaw, Sister, Q.A.I.M.N.S.R.
Elizabeth Mellor, Sister, Q.A.I.M.N.S.R.
Irene Maud Mary Moir, Sister, T.F.N.S.
Mary Murphy, Staff Nurse, Q.A.I.M.N.S.R.
Ada Alice Newsham, Sister, Q.A.I.M.N.S.R.
Honoria O'Sullivan, Staff Nurse, T.F.N.S.
Mary Patterson, Sister, Q.A.I.M.N.S.R.
Isobel Pirie, Temp Nurse, attd. Q.A.I.M.N.S.R.
Christina Reid, Sister, Q.A.I.M.N.S.R.
Evelyn Maud Reid, Sister, Q.A.I.M.N.S.R.
Marguerite Georgia Rundle, Voluntary Aid Detachment, B.R.C.S.
Pauline Schor, Sister, Q.A.I.M.N.S.R.
Gladys Alma Seeley, Sister, Q.A.I.M.N.S.R.
Sarah Anne Shorrock, Voluntary Aid Detachment, St. John's Ambulance Brigade
Augusta Mary Elizabeth Somers, Sister, Q.A.I.M.N.S.R.
Ida Florence Welch, Sister, T.F.N.S.
Eliza Wilcock, Sister, Q.A.I.M.N.S.R.
Edith Mary Williams, Sister, Q.A.I.M.N.S.R.
Norah Mary Willies, Sister, Q.A.I.M.N.S.R.
Ellen Rachel Willings, Sister, Q.A.I.M.N.S.R.

Australian Army Nursing Service
Agnes Grace Bonnar, Sister
Isabella Tait Berwick, Temp Sister
Elsie May Cooke, Sister
Katherine Minnie Donaldson, Sister
Ellen Ethel Jean Hedderman, Staff Nurse
Eileen Isabel Hutton, Staff Nurse
Maggie Jones, Sister
Nano Nagle, Temp Sister
Elizabeth Jane White, Sister

In recognition of valuable services with the Armies in France and Flanders — 
Agnes Mary A'Hern, Sister, Q.A.I.M.N.S.
Martha Aitkin, Sister, T.F.N.S.
Lilian Allen, Nurse, Voluntary Aid Detachment
Mary Dorothy Allen, Acting Sister, Q.A.I.M.N.S.R.
Katharine Amelia Allsop, Sister, Q.A.I.M.N.S.
Theodora Frances Almack, Nurse, Voluntary Aid Detachment, B.R.C.S.
Margaret Rita Arnold, Acting Sister, Civilian Hospital, Special Reserve
Edith Arnott, Nurse, Voluntary Aid Detachment
Edith Gwenllian Austin, Acting Sister, Q.A.I.M.N.S.R.
Mildred Isabel Austin, Sister, T.F.N.S.
Amelia Ayre, Acting Matron, Q.A.I.M.N.S.
Margaret Dow Bain, Sister, T.F.N.S.
Margaret Hendeboorcke Ballance  Sister, St. John's Ambulance Brigade
Mary Kathleen Barclay, Sister, Q.A.I.M.N.S.
Kathleen Barrett, Asst. Nurse, Voluntary Aid Detachment
Mabel Katie Barr-Stevens, Voluntary Aid Detachment Nurse, B.R.C.S.
Grizel Gillespie Bayley, Nurse, Voluntary Aid Detachment
Helen Margaret Bennett, Sister, B.R.C.S.
Aline Quiddington Blades, Acting Sister, Civilian Hospital, Special Reserve
Margaret Janette Blake, Nurse, Voluntary Aid Detachment
Olive Sibella Bonham-Carter, Asst. Nurse, Voluntary Aid Detachment
Mary Cawston Bousfield, Asst. Nurse, Voluntary Aid Detachment
Eliza Annie Bradshaw, Sister, T.F.N.S.
Margaret Gwladys JBraithwaite, Asst. Nurse, Voluntary Aid Detachment
Beatrice Alice Brayshaw, Sister, T.F.N.S.
Mildred Breeze, Acting Sister, Q.A.I.M.N.S.R.
Margaret Ethel Briggs, Sister, T.F.N.S.
Janet Sinclair Bruce Brotchie, Staff Nurse, Civilian Hospital, Special Reserve
Margaret Crichton Brown, Staff Nurse, Q.A.I.M.N.S.R.
Helen Grace Brownrigg, Asst. Nurse, Voluntary Aid Detachment
Marjory Mitchell Bruce, Sister, Q.A.I.M.N.S.R.
Ida Doris Bull, Nurse, Voluntary Aid Detachment, St. John Ambulance Association
Ailsa Noel Hurford Bullough, Nurse, Voluntary Aid Detachment
Caroline Muriel Bulteel, Sister, T.F.N.S.
Eileen Mary Byrne, Acting Sister, Civilian Hospital, Special Reserve
Annie MacMillan Caldwell, Nurse, Voluntary Aid Detachment
Mabel Copeland Capper
Lucy Kate Card, Nurse, Voluntary Aid Detachment
Rose Carter Shaw Carleton, Sister, Q.A.I.M.N.S.
Kate Carruthers  Sister, T.F.N.S.
Hilda Clarkson, Nurse, Spec. Med. Probationer, T.F.N.S.
Caroline Mary Clements, Sister, Q.A.I.M.N.S.R.
Violet Collett, Nurse, Voluntary Aid Detachment, St. John's Ambulance Brigade
Eva Colvin, Nurse, Voluntary Aid Detachment
Edith Elizabeth Cooke, Sister, Civilian Hospital, Special Reserve
Katie Charlotte Cooper, Sister, T.F.N.S.
Cicely Gladys Cope-Morgan, Nurse, Voluntary Aid Detachment
May Susan Corsellis, Asst. Nurse, Voluntary Aid Detachment
Susanna. Coulter, Sister, Civilian Hospital, Special Reserve
Florence Cowper, Nurse, Voluntary Aid Detachment
Mary Ann Cracknell, Sister, Asst. Matron, T.F.N.S.
Margaret Wilson Craig, Nurse, Voluntary Aid Detachment
Dorothea Mary Lynette Crewdson  Nurse, Voluntary Aid Detachment
Edith Winifred Croft, Acting Sister, Q.A.I.M.N.S.
The Hon Dorothy Mary Cross, Asst. Nurse, Voluntary Aid Detachment
The Hon Georgina Marjorie Cross, Asst. Nurse, Voluntary Aid Detachment
Nora Cullen, Asst. Nurse, Voluntary Aid Detachment
Mary Maitland Cunningham, Sister, T.F.N.S.
Edith Denison, Sister, T.F.N.S.
Norah Creina Denny, Nurse, Spec. Med. Probationer, attd. Q.A.I.M.N.S.
Amelia Victoria Derry, Sister, T.F.N.S.
Dorothy Mary Dodson, Sister, B.R.C.S.
Zoe Blanche Douet, Sister, T.F.N.S.
Estelle Mary Doyle, Sister, Q.A.I.M.N.S.R.
Edith Maud Drummond-Hay, Nurse, Voluntary Aid Detachment
Helen Sinclair Ellis, Nurse, Voluntary Aid Detachment
Frances Georgina Fegan, Staff Nurse, T.F.N.S.
Ellen Fewlass, Acting Sister, Q.A.I.M.N.S.R.
Elizabeth Young Fleming, Sister, T.F.N.S.
Millie Float, Asst. Nurse, Voluntary Aid Detachment
Eliza Anneta Forrest, Staff Nurse, Q.A.I.M.N.S.R.
Catharine Forrestal, Asst. Nurse, Voluntary Aid Detachment
Elizabeth Fowler, Sister, Q.A.I.M.N.S.R.
Jessie Fraser, Sister, T.F.N.S.
Gladys Maud Gardiner, Nurse, Voluntary Aid Detachment
Elsie Garner, Acting Sister, Civilian Hospital, Special Reserve
Elizabeth Gibson, Acting Sister, Q.A.I.M.N.S.
Elsie Mabel Gladstone, Acting Sister, Civilian Hospital, Special Reserve
Margaret Anne Gray, Sister, B.R.C.S.
Margaret Greatorex, Nurse, Voluntary Aid Detachment
Olive Greenwell, Nurse, Spec. Med. Probationer, T.F.N.S.
Louise Griffiths, Sister, B.R.C.S.
Betty Georgina Hacker, Acting Sister, Civilian Hospital, Special Reserve
Sarah Hands, Sister, T.F.N.S.
Mary Kathleen Harding, Nurse, Voluntary Aid Detachment, St. John's Ambulance Brigade
Nellie Hayes, Sister, T.F.N.S.
Isabel Stephen Henderson, Staff Nurse, Q.A.I.M.N.S.R.
Jean Wyper Fergus Henderson, Sister, T.F.N.S.
Marian Hissey, Acting Sister, Civilian Hospital, Special Reserve
Annie Elizabeth Hobday, Sister, T.F.N.S.
Mary Bridget Hogan, Staff Nurse, Q.A.I.M.N.S.R.
Hilda Hollings, Nurse, Voluntary Aid Detachment
Harriet Rhoda Howard, Sister, Q.A.I.M.N.S.R.
Margaret Alice Howe, Staff Nurse, T.F.N.S.
Gertrude Harriette Howell-Evans, Asst. Nurse, Voluntary Aid Detachment
Alice Emily Howship, Nurse, Voluntary Aid Detachment
Edith Isaac, Nurse, Voluntary Aid Detachment
Cicely Mary Jackson, Nurse, Voluntary Aid Detachment, St. John's Ambulance Brigade
Ethel Webb Johnson, Acting Sister, Q.A.I.M.N.S.R.
Sarah Evelyn Johnson  Acting Sister, Civilian Hospital, Special Reserve
Lyelee Johnstone, Sister, Q.A.I.M.N.S.R.
Evaline Sarah Jones, Acting Sister, Q.A.I.M.N.S.R.
Annie Day Kearney, Nurse, Voluntary Aid Detachment
Jane Pauline Kelsey, Acting Sister, Civilian Hospital, Special Reserve
Ida Maud Kenshole, Asst. Nurse, Voluntary Aid Detachment
Alice May Keyser, Nurse, Voluntary Aid Detachment
Teresa King, Sister, St. John's Ambulance Brigade
Evelyn Kinnear, Acting Sister, Q.A.I.M.N.S.R.
Dorothy Maud Knights, Sister, Civilian Hospital, Special Reserve
Mary Lavie, Asst. Nurse, Spec. War Probationer, attd. Q.A.I.M.N.S.
Dorthy Grace Lawson, Nurse, Voluntary Aid Detachment, B.R.C.S.
Ida Blanche Leedam, Sister, Civilian Hospital, Special Reserve
The Lady Rosemary Leveson-Gower (now The Viscountess Ednam), Nurse, Voluntary Aid Detachment
Elizabeth Ethel Lewis, Nurse, Voluntary Aid Detachment
Mary Jeffrey Liddeil, Staff Nurse, T.F.N.S.
Margaret Russell Lillie, Sister, T.F.N.S.
The Hon Edith Modwena Littleton, Asst. Nurse, Spec. Med. Probationer, attd. Q.A.I.M.N.S.
Mabel Jane Lloyd, Staff Nurse, T.F.N.S.
Edith Gladys Lunn, Nurse, Voluntary Aid Detachment
Rowena Jeans Lush, Sister, T.F.N.S.
Hermione Lyttleton, Nurse, Spec. Med
Probationer, attd. Q.A.I.M.N.S.
Annie Ellis MacAndrew, Acting Sister, Q.A.I.M.N.S.R.
Mary Clark Macfarlane, Nurse, Voluntary Aid Detachment
Jeannie Macleod, Sister, T.F.N.S.
Ruth Beatrice Manning, Nurse, Voluntary Aid Detachment
Mary Stewart Marrow
Daisy Maud Martin, Sister, Q.A.I.M.N.S.
Catherine McIntyre Matheson, Sister, T.F.N.S.
Aoine Mathieson, Acting Sister, Q.A.I.M.N.S.R.
Margaret McCowan, Voluntary Aid Detachment, Nurse, B.R.C.S.
Helen Wightman McDonald, Nurse, Voluntary Aid Detachment
Harriet McIlwain, Staff Nurse, Q.A.I.M.N.S.R.
Kathleen McLean, Sister, Q.A.I.M.N.S.R.
Christina McDonald McLennan, Sister, Q.A.I.M.N.S.R.
Mary Metcalf, Nurse, Voluntary Aid Detachment
Charlotte Forbes Middleton, Acting Sister Q.A.I.M.N.S.R.
Jessie Miller, Sister, B.R.C.S.
Elsie Mollett, Asst. Nurse, Voluntary Aid Detachment
Mary Beatrice Molloy, Sister, B.R.C.S.
Norah Molloy, Asst. Matron, Q.A.I.M.N.S.
Margaret Glencorse Montgomery, Nurse, Voluntary Aid Detachment
Clare Mary Morrin, Acting Sister, Civilian Hospital, Special Reserve
Gertrude Charlotte Muriel Morris, Nurse, Voluntary Aid Detachment, St. John's Ambulance Association
Jessie Alexander Morty, Sister, Q.A.I.M.N.S.R.
Faith Moulson, Acting Sister, Q.A.I.M.N.S.R.
Amy Laurie Neale, Nurse, Voluntary Aid Detachment, B.R.C.S.
Bernadette Leah Nelligan, Sister, B.R.C.S.
Annie Thomson Nicoll, Staff Nurse, Civilian Hospital, Special Reserve
Sarah Frances Norfield, Sister, B.R.C.S.
Leah Northwood, Staff Nurse, T.F.N.S.
Janet Balderston Campbell Orchardson, T.F.N.S.
Sheila O'Riordan, Staff Nurse, Q.A.I.M.N.S.R.
Cecile Parke, Nurse, Spec. Med. Probationer, attd. Q.A.I.M.N.S.
Edith Irene Pastfield, Sister, T.F.N.S.
Elizabeth Mary Patrickson, Sister, T.F.N.S.
Dorothy Ann Pexkin, Nurse, Voluntary Aid Detachment
Alice Mary Phillips, Sister, B.R.C.S.
Marian August Sybella Pidcock-Henzell, Nurse, Voluntary Aid Detachment
Evelyn Mary Pike, Acting Sister, Q.A.I.M.N.S.R.
Evelyn Janet Pinkerton, Asst. Nurse, Voluntary Aid Detachment
Mise Hilda Mary Purse, Sister, T.F.N.S.
Emily Raven, Acting Sister, Civil Hospital Res
Adeline Reburn, Acting Sister, Civilian Hospital, Special Reserve
Alice Amy Algar Rennison, Acting Sister, Civilian Hospital, Special Reserve
Alice Maud Reynolds, Sister, B.R.C.S.
Elizabeth Riach, Acting Sister, Civilian Hospital, Special Reserve
Dorothy May Ridley, Nurse, Voluntary Aid Detachment
Violet Riley, Acting Sister, Civilian Hospital, Special Reserve
Charlotte Roberts, Nurse, Voluntary Aid Detachment
Kathleen Roberts, Nurse, Voluntary Aid Detachment
Margaret Myllim Roberts, Sister, Q.A.I.M.N.S.
Ada Hushforth, Sister, Civilian Hospital, Special Reserve
Amelia Kelmar St. Leger, Acting Matron, Q.A.I.M.N.S.R.
Hilda Maud Sandys, Nurse, Voluntary Aid Detachment
Annie Leila Sartain, Staff Nurse, Civilian Hospital, Special Reserve
Mabel Schotburgh, Staff Nurse, T.F.N.S.
Louise Mary Scott-Bamford, Nurse, Spec. Med. Probationer, attd. Q.A.I.M.N.S.
Dorothy Nina Seymour, Voluntary Aid Detachment, B.R.C.S.
Florence Nightingale Shore, Acting Sister, Q.A.I.M.N.S.R.
Rebecca Alice Shorten, Acting Sister, Q.A.I.M.N.S.R.
Jeanie Winchester Simon, Acting Sister, Q.A.I.M.N.S.R.
Bridget Mary Slevin, Sister, St. John's Ambulance Brigade
Elizabeth Slingsby, Acting Sister, Civilian Hospital, Special Reserve
Annie Sarah Sly, Sister, T.F.N.S.
Mary Patullo Stout, Nurse, Voluntary Aid Detachment
Sybil Mary Stratton, Asst. Nurse, Voluntary Aid Detachment
Marian Streatfield, Nurse, Voluntary Aid Detachment, B.R.C.S.
Dorothea Mary Gladys Sutherland, Nurse, Voluntary Aid Detachment
Lillian Charlotte Suttor, Staff Nurse, Q.A.I.M.N.S.R.
Mary Maud Isabel Thomas, Nurse, Voluntary Aid Detachment
Ella Margaret Usherwood, Sister, Q.A.I.M.N.S.R.
Christian Valentine, Acting Sister, Q.A.I.M.N.S.R.
Robina Warden, Sister, B.R.C.S.
Agnes Helen Warner, Nurse, Voluntary Aid Detachment
Rebecca Tringham Watson, Sister, T.F.N.S.
Ruth Millicent Watson, Nurse, Spec. Med. Probationer, attd. Q.A.I.M.N.S.
Amelia Allan Watt, Nurse, Voluntary Aid Detachment
Isabella Webster, Acting Sister, Q.A.I.M.N.S.R.
Daisy Constance Wells, Acting Sister, Civilian Hospital, Special Reserve
Florence Rose Wells, Staff Nurse, Q.A.I.M.N.S.R.
Ethel Minnie White, Nurse, Voluntary Aid Detachment, St. John's Ambulance Brigade
Lilian Eliza White, Staff Nurse, Q.A.I.M.N.S.R.
Jean Strachan Whyte  Sister, T.F.N.S.
Annie Maud Williams, Nurse, Voluntary Aid Detachment
Hannah Wilson, Sister, T.F.N.S.
Margaret Wilson, Nurse, Voluntary Aid Detachment
Margaret Hannah Wilson, Sister, B.R.C.S.
Shirley Alice Wilson, Sister, T.F.N.S.
Dorothy Winder, Nurse, Voluntary Aid Detachment
Grace Vanstone Winter, Acting Sister, Q.A.I.M.N.S.R.
Lucy Elizabeth Wood, Nurse, Voluntary Aid Detachment
Rose Dorothea Wood, Nurse, Voluntary Aid Detachment
Madge Woodhouse, Asst. Nurse, Voluntary Aid Detachment
Ernestine Wray, Acting Sister, Q.A.I.M.N.S.R.
Alice Wright, Sister, T.F.N.S.
Emily Wright, Acting Sister, Q.A.I.M.N.S.R.
Kate Sutherland Wright, Acting Sister, Civilian Hospital, Special Reserve
Nora Ramscar Wright, Nurse, Voluntary Aid Detachment
Eva Mary Ingram Yelf, Sister, T.F.N.S.
Sarah Neale Youngman, Staff Nurse, T.F.N.S.

Canadian Army Medical Corps
Sarah Ann Archard, Nursing Sister
Christiarma Pauline Arnold, Nursing Sister
Katharine Elizabeth Barden, Nursing Sister
Leila Brady, Nursing Sister
Evadne Kilgour Cotter, Nursing Sister
Gertrude Catherine Cresswell, Nursing Sister
Evangeline Lydia Emsley, Nursing Sister
Mies Mary Evelyn Engelke, Nursing Sister
Annabel Jane Fraser, Nursing Sister
Jessie Margaret Gent, Nursing Sister
Gertrude Ellinor Halpenny, Nursing Sister
Alice Eva Hindley, Nursing Sister
Margaret Johnston, Nursing Sister
Margaret Leamy, Nursing Sister
Carolyn June Little, Nursing Sister
Katharine Anna MacLeod, Nursing Sister
Mary Aleda MacNaughton, Nursing Sister
Mary McPherson, Nursing Sister
Rachel McConnell, Nursing Sister
Louise Stanton McGreer, Nursing Sister
Minnie MacInnes, Nursing Sister
Myrtle MacMillan, Nursing Sister
Harriet Tremaine Meiklejohn, Nursing Sister
Minnie Ethel Misner, Nursing Sister
Emma Grace Moore, Nursing Sister
Eva Lillian Morkill, Nursing Sister
Isabel Baird Forbes Muir, Nursing Sister
Elsie Sara Nicholson, Nursing Sister
Kathleen Panton, Nursing Sister
Marion Ethel Price, Nursing Sister
Ethel Gertrude Saunders, Nursing Sister
Alice Mary Stewart, Nursing Sister
Mary Catherine Stewart, Nursing Sister
Agnes Sutherland, Nursing Sister
Annette Maud Tate, Nursing Sister
Ada Amelia Taylor, Nursing Sister
Alice Gertrude Turner, Nursing Sister
Marjorie Mabel Webb, Nursing Sister
Margaret Jane Woods, Nursing Sister
Helen Janet Woolson, Nursing Sister

Australian Army Nursing Service
Ellen Bennett Brown, Sister
Ethel Maud Dement, Sister
Erne May Garden, Sister
Beatrice Mary Gibbings, Sister
Esther Hart, Sister
Amy King, Sister
Elma Mary Linklater, Sister
Missi Katharine Lawrence Porter, Sister
Louisa Snelling, Sister
Valerie Henrietta Ziohy Woinarski, Head Sister

New Zealand Army Nursing Service
Margaret Gebrgina Davies, Sister

South African Military Nursing Service
Mary Hamilton Campbell, Nursing Sister
Alice Beryl Conyngham, Nursing Sister
Bessie Wagstaff, Staff Nurse, SA Medical Nursing Service, attd. Q.A.I.M.N.S.R.

In recognition of valuable services with the British Forces in Italy —
Jane Crawford, Staff, Nurse, Q.A.I.M.N.S.R.
Marjory Winton Isabel Heaton-Ellis, Voluntary Aid Detachment Asst. Nurse, St. John's Ambulance Brigade
Laura Elizabeth James  Acting Matron, Q.A.I.M.N.S.
Betty Powell-Jenkins, Sister, T.F.N.S.

Australian Army Nursing Service
Evelyn Victoria Hutt, Sister

In recognition of valuable services with the British Forces in Mesopotamia
Elizabeth Grace Adams, Staff Nurse, Q.A.I.M.N.S.R.
Grace Boshell, Staff Nurse, Q.A.I.M.N.S.R.
Marian Frances Bradshaw, Sister, Q.A.I.M.N.S.R.
Ethel Isabel Brookes, Temp Nurse, attd. Queen Alexandra's Medical Nursing Service India
Minnie Butter, Sister, T.F.N.S.
Elizabeth Mary Carlton, Staff Nurse, Q.A.I.M.N.S.R.
Ethel Winifred Dearie, Sister, Q.A.I.M.N.S.R.
Ellen Disney, Staff Nurse, Q.A.I.M.N.S.R.
Winifred Mabel. Edward-Jones, Temp Nurse, attd. Queen Alexandra's Medical Nursing Service India
Muriel Gwendoline Etchell, Staff Nurse Q.A.I.M.N.S.R.
Isobel Muriel Guthrie, Temp Nurse, attd. Queen Alexandra's Medical Nursing Service India
Jenny Hermon, Temp Nurse, attd. Q.A.I.M.N.S.R.
Grace Bertha Kruger, Temp Nurse, attd. Queen Alexandra's Medical Nursing Service India
Lizzie May, Sister, Q.A.I.M.N.S.R.
Anna Patricia Meaney, Sister, Queen Alexandra's Medical Nursing Service India
Minnie Vincent Levey, Sister, Q.A.I.M.N.S.R.
Kathleen Elizabeth Leyden, Temp Nurse, attd. Queen Alexandra's Medical Nursing Service India
Helen MacHardy, Staff Nurse, Q.A.I.M.N.S.R.
Annie Margaret Macintosh, Sister, Q.A.I.M.N.S.R.
Norah Callwell Packenham-Walsh, Staff Nurse, Q.A.I.M.N.S.R.
Christine Sinclair, Sister, Q.A.I.M.N.S.R.
Mary Catherine Trower, Sister, Q.A.I.M.N.S.R.
Alice Somerford Walker, Sister, Q.A.I.M.N.S.R.
Elsie Joan Wells, Staff Nurse, T.F.N.S.
Dorothy Wood, Sister, T.F.N.S.

In recognition of valuable services with the British Forces in East Africa —
Gertrude Annie Fuller, Sister, Q.A.I.M.N.S.R.
Edith Spencer, Nursing Sister, East African Nursing Service
Kate Thompson, Staff Nurse, Q.A.I.M.N.S.R.
Catherine Tracey-Smith, Nursing Sister, Q.A.I.M.N.S.R.
Maud Mary Wood, Staff Nurse, Q.A.I.M.N.S.R.

South African Military Nursing Service
Dolores Lucy Bishop, Staff Nurse
Alexandra Elizabeth, Lowe, Nursing Sister
Margaret Roberts, Nursing Sister
Alice Rose-Innes, Nursing Sister
Frederica Walbrugh, Nursing Sister

In recognition of valuable services within the Union of South Africa in connection with the War —
Nurse Lilian Mary Blackburn, SA Military Nursing Service (S.A.M.N.S.)
Nursing Sister Daisy Hamilton, S.A.M.N.S.
Nursing Sister Agnes Louch, S.A.M.N.S.
Nurse Avis Kathleen Philpott, S.A.M.N.S.

Awarded a Bar to the Royal Red Cross

In recognition of valuable services with the Armies in Egypt — 
Emily Agnes Cox  Matron, Q.A.I.M.N.S.R.
Katherine Forbes Gordon Skinner  Sister, Q.A.I.M.N.S.

In recognition of valuable services with the Armies in France and Flanders — 

Margaret Alexander  Sister in Charge, Civilian Hospital, Special Reserve
Gertrude Mary Allen  Acting Matron, Q.A.I.M.N.S.
Annie Inglis Baird  Sister in Charge, Q.A.I.M.N.S.R.
Mary Cruikshank Laing  Sister in Charge, T.F.N.S.
Lilian Emily MacKay  Acting Principal Matron, Q.A.I.M.N.S.
Ethel Jane Minns  Acting Principal Matron, Q.A.I.M.N.S.
Mary Louisa Rannie  Acting Principal Matron, Q.A.I.M.N.S.
Una Elizabeth Russell-Lee  Sister in Charge, Q.A.I.M.N.S.R.
Eva Owen Schofield  Sister in Charge, Civilian Hospital, Special Reserve
Adelaide Louisa Walker  Acting Matron, Q.A.I.M.N.S.

Canadian Army Medical Corps
Evelyn Martha Wilson  Matron

New Zealand Army Nursing Service
Evelyn Gertrude Brooke  Matron

In recognition of valuable services with the British Forces in Italy —
Margaret Steenson  Principal Matron, Q.A.I.M.N.S.

In recognition of valuable services with the British Forces in Mesopotamia
Ethel Rose Collins  Sister, Q.A.I.M.N.S.
Florence May Hodgins  Matron, Q.A.I.M.N.S.
Edith MacFarlane  Matron, T.F.N.S.
Jessie Phillipson Stow  Sister, Q.A.I.M.N.S.R.
Mass Mary Walker  Sister, Q.A.I.M.N.S.

Kaisar-i-Hind Medal
First Class
The Reverend George Pittendrigh, Additional Member of the Council of His Excellency the Governor of Madras, and Professor of the Madras Christian College
Ida Monahan, wife of Mr. Francis John Monahan, Indian Civil Service, Bengal
Lt.-Col. Richard Henderson Castor, Indian Medical Service, Civil Surgeon, Moulmein, Burma
Motirain Showkiram Advani, District Judge, Broach, Bombay
Clement Cornelius Caleb  Professor of Physiology, King Edward Memorial College, Lahore
Hugh Gordon Roberts  officiating Civil Surgeon, Shillong, Assam
Henry Martin Bull, Member of the Majlis-i-Khas, Gwalior State, Central India
Steuart Durand Pears, late Chief Engineer and Secretary to Government, Public Works Department, Madras
Khan Bahadur Dhunjishaw Cooverji Pestonji, Honorary Magistrate, Mhow, Central India
John Somerwell Hoyland, Head Master, Friends Mission High School, Hoshangabad, Central Provinces

Medal of the Order of the British Empire

Military Division
For Gallantry
Marjorie Beryl Brisley, Women's Royal Air Force, Upton, Chester. Citation – "For gallant conduct and devotion to duty at Upton on the 17th December, 1918, in extricating one of the occupants from a crashed aeroplane, and assisting to remove the second man from the wreckage."

Distinguished Service Order (DSO)

In recognition of distinguished services rendered during the war —
Capt. Wyndham Lindsay Birch  West Yorkshire Regiment
Lt.-Col. Ernest Leslie Gossage  Royal Artillery
Capt. Roy King  Australian Flying Corps
Lt.-Col. Cuthbert Trelawder Maclean  Royal Scots Fusiliers
Maj. Laurence Arthur Pattinson  Royal Fusiliers
Lt.-Col. Charles Erskine Risk, Royal Marine Light Infantry
Maj. John Cannon Russell, Royal Engineers

For distinguished service in connection with military operations in the Balkans —
Capt. Evelyn Hugh Barker  King's Royal Rifle Corps 
Temp Lt. Edmund Francis Herring  Royal Field Artillery
Temp Maj. Basil Archer. Jackson  Shropshire Light Infantry
Maj. Denis Erskine Knollys, Indian Army
Maj. John Arthur Claude Kreyer, Indian Army
Temp Maj. Humphrey Francis Mason, Royal Garrison Artillery
Temp Maj. Anton Peltzer, East Lancashire Regiment
Temp Maj. Harold George Rickwood  South Lancashire Regiment
Lt. Ernest Monkhouse Rogers-Tillstone  Royal Field Artillery, Special Reserve
Temp Maj. Frank Vincent Shaw  Royal Field Artillery
Capt. and Bt. Maj. Percy Stanley Tomlinson, Royal Army Medical Corps
Capt. Stanley Watson  Cheshire Regiment

For distinguished service in connection with military operations in East Africa —
Capt. Edward Beckford Bevan, Norfolk Regiment and King's African Rifles
Capt. Alexander Charles Masters  South Wales Borderers, and King's African Rifles
Capt. Charles George Phillips  West Yorkshire Regiment and King's African Rifles

For distinguished services rendered in connection with military operations in Eastern Russia —
Temp Lt. Charles Dunlop  Scottish Rifles

Canadian Forces
Lt.-Col. Joseph Whiteside Boyle 

For distinguished service in connection with military operations in France and Flanders—
Temp Maj. Douglas Charles Allen, Tank Corps
Capt. and Bt. Maj. Henry Adair Allen, Royal Inniskilling Fusiliers
Maj. Fearnley Anderson  Seaforth Highlanders
Temp Maj. William Arnold, Tank Corps
Lt.-Col. Walter Arthy, Royal Garrison Artillery
Capt. Ernest Arthur Ash, Middlesex Regiment, Special Reserve,  Durham Light Infantry
Temp Maj. Walter Hubert Baddeley  East Surrey Regiment
Capt. Basil Hume Badham, Royal Scots Fusiliers
Lt. Colin Willoughby Baker  Leicestershire Regiment
Maj. John Arthur Ballard, Royal Field Artillery
Acting Capt. Albert Methuen Bankier  Argyll and Sutherland Highlanders
Capt. Arthur Gordon Barry  Manchester Regiment,  Machine Gun Corps
Capt. John Nelson Barstow  Royal Field Artillery
Maj. Miles Beevor, East Kent Regiment, attd. Middlesex Regiment
Capt. Augustus Charles Herbert Benke  London Regiment
Temp Capt. Fred Roland Berridge  Northamptonshire Regiment
Capt. Frederick William Bewsher  London Regiment
Maj. Robert Bryan Bickerdike, Royal Field Artillery
Temp Maj. Hugh George Bigg-Wither, Duke of Cornwall's Light Infantry
Maj. William Birtwistle, Royal Field Artillery
Capt. Norman Valentine Blacker  East Yorkshire Regiment, attd. Machine Gun Corps
Capt. Patrick James Blair, Royal Scots, attd. Royal Highlanders
Maj. Edward Hoblyn Warren Bolitho, Royal Field Artillery
Quartermaster and Capt. Francis Sydney Boshell  Royal Berkshire Regiment
Capt. Henry Kirk Boyle, West Yorkshire Regiment, attd. Machine Gun Corps
Capt. Edwin Percival Brassey  Coldstream Guards, Special Reserve, attd. 2nd Battalion
Capt. Richard Hugh Royds Brocklebank, 9th Lancers
Maj. Donald Brown, Royal Field Artillery
Temp Capt. Herbert Compton Browning  Bedfordshire Regiment
Lt. John Nevile Buchanan  Grenadier Guards, Special Reserve
Lt.-Col. Stephen Darle Bullen, Royal Garrison Artillery
Quartermaster and Maj. John Burke  Royal Dublin Fusiliers
Capt. Charles Desborough Burnell, London Regiment
Temp Maj. Richard Parry Burnett  South Staffordshire Regiment, attd. Royal Fusiliers
Maj. Stanilaus Burrell, Northumberland Hussars
Capt. Henry Neville Burroughes  Royal Army Medical Corps
Maj. Ivor Buxton, Norfolk Yeomanry
Lt. Aylmer Lochiel Cameron  Royal Field Artillery
Capt. Gerald Goodwin Carpenter, Suffolk Regiment
Maj. Sydney Carwithen, Royal Artillery
Lt. James Reid Christie, Gordon Highlanders
Maj. Douglas Clapham  Royal Garrison Artillery
Temp Capt. Frederick William Clark  Royal Engineers
Lt.-Col. Humphrey Nichols Mavesyn Clegg, Denb. Yeomanry,  Royal Welsh Fusiliers
Capt. William George Alexander Coldwell, Northamptonshire Regiment,  Machine Gun Corps
Capt. Louis Andrew Connolly  Royal Field Artillery
Maj. Edward Douglas Montague Hunter Cooke, Royal Field Artillery
Capt. William Middleship Cooper  Royal Garrison Artillery
Capt. John Robert Cowan-Douglas  Highland Light Infantry
Capt. Victor Leopold Spencer Cowley  Royal Irish Rifles
Capt. Peter McFarland Cram, Cameron Highlanders
Maj. Francis Lindisfarne Morley Grossman  Royal Field Artillery
Lt.-Col. Ivor Bertram Fendall Carrie, Royal Garrison Artillery
Capt. and Bt. Maj. Henry Osborne Curtis  King's Royal Rifle Corps
Maj. Joseph Isidore D'Arcy, Royal Field Artillery
Maj. Delme William Campbell Davies-Evans, Pembroke Yeomanry, attd. Worcestershire Regiment
Temp Capt. Guy de Hoghton Dawson, Royal Army Medical Corps
Maj. Francis Reginald Day, Norfolk Regiment
Maj. Noel Arthur Lacy Day, Royal Artillery
Lt. William John Deacon, Royal Field Artillery
Maj. Harold Arthur Denham, Royal Garrison Artillery
Lt.-Col. and Bt. Col. Hugo Douglas De Prée  Royal Artillery
Temp Maj. John Bigelow Dodge  Suffolk Regiment, attd. Sussex Regiment
Maj. Charles Milligan Drew  Royal Army Medical Corps
Lt.-Col. Arthur. David Ducat  Royal Army Medical Corps
Temp Capt. George Vernon. Dudley  Royal Garrison Artillery
Maj. Gilbert Ewart Dunsdon, Royal Garrison Artillery
Maj. George Nowers Dyer, Royal West Surrey Regiment
Capt. and Bt. Maj. Thomas Ralph Eastwood  Rifle Brigade
Capt. Guy Janion Edwards  Coldstream Guards
Maj. Herbert Ivor Powell Edwards, Sussex Yeomanry, attd. Royal Sussex Regiment
Capt. John Henry Murray Edye  York and Lancaster Regiment
Maj. Arthur Henry Falkner, Royal Army Medical Corps, attd. Liverpool Regiment
Capt. Stafford Hubert Ferrand  King's Royal Rifle Corps, attd. East Yorkshire Regiment
Capt. John Malcolm Fisher  York and Lancaster Regiment
Temp Maj. Tom Forester, Machine Gun Corps
Lt.-Col. Douglas Evans Forman  Royal Horse Artillery, attd. Royal Field Artillery
Maj. John Raffray Foster, Royal Artillery
Temp Maj. Thomas Foster, Royal Sussex Regiment
Capt. John Alexander Foxton, West Yorkshire Regiment
Capt. and Bt. Maj. Geoffrey Ernest Warren Franklyn  Royal Artillery
Lt. Francis Hugh Fraser  West Riding Regiment
Capt. John Henry Pearson Frasef  Royal Army Medical Corps
Lt. Jasper Gray Frere  Suffolk Regiment, attd. Machine Gun Corps
Maj. Henry Davis Gale  Royal Artillery
Capt. Rudolf William Galloway  Royal Army Medical Corps
Capt. Lancelot Merivale Gibbs  Coldstream Guards
Lt. William Charles Disraeli Giffin  Royal Irish Rifles
Capt. and Bt. Maj. Halbert James Glendinning, Royal Field Artillery
Maj. Thomas Ciosbie Goff, Royal Garrison Artillery
Capt. Alan Douglas Gordon  Royal Berkshire Regiment Machine Gun Corps
Capt. Gerald Wentworth Gore-Langton  18th Hussars
Capt. Christopher Hugh Gotta  Devonshire Regiment
Capt. Kenneth Ian Gourlay  Royal Engineers
Capt. and Bt. Maj. Arthur Edward Grasett  Royal Engineers
Temp Capt. Frederick Buss Gray-stone  Royal Artillery
Temp Lt.-Col. James McGavin Greig, West Yorkshire Regiment, attd. York and Lancaster Regiment
Maj. Howard Charles Grabble, Royal Field Artillery
Capt. Edward Johns Grinling  Lincolnshire Regiment
Maj. Arthur Marjoribanks Guild, Highland Cyclist Battalion, attd. London Regiment
Maj. Atthelstane Claud Gunter, Royal Garrison Artillery
Capt. Henry Ronald Hall  Royal Field Artillery
Temp Capt. John Hathorn Hall  
Maj. Philip de Havilland Hall  Royal Engineers
Temp Maj. Robert Bruce Harkness, Welsh Regiment
Lt. Ernest Albert Edward Hart  Royal Field Artillery
Temp Lt.-Col. George White Hawkes  Royal Irish Rifles
Capt. Cecil Richard Hayward, West Somerset Yeomanry,  Somerset Light Infantry
Quartermaster and Maj. Alfred Noble Haywood, 6th Dragoon Guards
Capt. Henry Eric Hebbert  Royal Engineers
Temp Maj. James Gerald Patrick Heffernan  Royal Dublin Fusiliers
Temp Lt. Henry Norris Hemsley  
Lt.Percival Robert Henri  attd. London Regiment
Maj. Robert Edward Udny Hermon-Hodge, Oxfordshire Yeomanry
Temp Maj. Laurence Carr Hill  Royal Engineers
Capt. Edward Godfrey Hoare, Yorkshire Light Infantry, attd. Royal Lancaster Regiment
Maj. Rupert Thurstan Holland  Royal Artillery
Lt. Ernest William Home, Devonshire Regiment
Lt.-Col. Guy Jefferys Hornsby-Wright, Essex Regiment
Lt. Allen Crawford Howard  Royal Engineers
Capt. William James Hddswortih Howard, Liverpool Regiment
Capt. Ivor-Robert Hudleston, Royal Army Medical Corps
Capt. and Bt. Maj. Hubert-Charles Edward Hull, Royal West Surrey Regiment
Temp Maj. Arthur Frederick Hunt
Maj. John Markham Ingram, Royal Field Artillery
Maj. Thomas William Talbot Isaac, Gloucestershire Regiment, attd. Yorkshire Light Infantry
Maj. Claud Hugh Irving Jackson, Royal Scots Fusiliers, attd. Machine Gun Corps
Lt.-Col. Arthur Hyde Kane, Royal Garrison Artillery
Lt. Peter Chrichton Kay  Middlesex Regiment
Lt. John Dunbar Kelly, Royal Army Service Corps
Temp Capt. Percy Hubert Keys  Royal Engineers
Temp Maj. Albert George Keyser, Machine Gun Corps
Capt. Miles Henry King  West Riding Regiment
Temp Capt. Geoffry Neville Kingsford  Royal Engineers
Capt. James Joseph Kingstone  2nd Dragoon Guards
Maj. Cyril Kitchin, Middlesex Regiment
Temp Capt. George Ledgard  Royal Engineers
Temp Maj. John Evan Lewis, Tank Corps
Maj. Frederick Beadle Leyland  7th Hussars
Maj. Owen Fitzstephen Lloyd, Connaught Rangers, secd. Tank Corps
Temp Lt. Commander Edward Marston Lockwood 
Col. William Longbottom, North Lancashire Regiment
Lt. Charles Edward Berkeley Lowe  Royal Garrison Artillery
Maj. Philip Lyon, North Staffordshire Regiment, attd. Tank Corps
Capt. and Bt. Maj. Archer Geoffrey Lyttelton, Welsh Regiment,  Machine Gun Corps
Maj. Lachlan Mackinnon, Gordon Highlanders, attd. Argyll and Sutherland Highlanders
Lt.-Col. James Strachan MacLeod, Durham Light Infantry, attd. Lancashire Fusiliers
Temp Lt. Thomas Bertram Joseph Mahar  
Lt. Richard Herbert Marryatt, Worcestershire Regiment
Capt. and Hon Maj. James Evan Baillie Martin  late King's Royal Rifle Corps
Lt. Frank Arnold Vivanti Dewar Mathews  Royal Engineers
Temp Maj. Ralph Walter Maude
Capt. Godfrey Kindersley Maurice, Royal Army Medical Corps
Maj. William McClure, South Lancashire Regiment
Capt. Arthur Cecil Hays McCullagh  Royal Army Medical Corps
Maj. Arthur Sydney Ponsonby McGhee, Royal Garrison Artillery
Capt. Neil McMicking  Royal Highlanders
Lt.-Col. John Hamilton Meikle, Royal Field Artillery
Temp Capt. John McKenzie Menzies  Royal Field Artillery
Lt. William Godwin Michelmore  Royal Engineers, attd. Royal Engineers
Lt. Gerard William Miller  Liverpool Regiment, attd. Lancashire Fusiliers
Capt. John Miller  Royal Army Medical Corps
Maj. Ralph Noel Vernan Montgomery, Royal Field Artillery
Temp Capt. Frederick William Moore  Royal Engineers
Capt. Harold Edward Moore  Royal Engineers
Capt. Howel Gwyn Moore-Gwyn  Rifle Brigade
Capt. William Duthie Morgan  Royal Field Artillery
Capt. Eric Wells Morris, Connaught Rangers, attd. Cheshire Regiment
Lt. David William Moss  Royal Garrison Artillery
Maj. and Bt. Lt.-Col. Thomas Couper Mudie, Royal Scots
Capt. John Muller  Welsh Regiment,  Machine Gun Corps
Temp Maj. William Murray  Highland Light Infantry, attd. Royal Scots
Temp Maj. William Hugh Murray, Scottish Rifles
Capt. Reginald Nasmith  Highland Light Infantry,  MrG. Corps
Capt. and Bt. Maj. Robert Francis Brydges Naylor  South Staffordshire Regiment
Temp Lt.-Col. Frederick William Monk Newell, Royal Engineers
Capt. Arthur Leslie Walter Newth  Gloucestershire Regiment, attd. London Regiment
Lt. Randolph Nicholson  Royal Field Artillery
Capt. Dudley Nisbet  South Lancashire Regiment
Maj. Donald de Courcey O'Grady, Royal Army Medical Corps
Lt. Herbert Joseph Mary O'Reilly  Royal Irish Rifles
Temp Lt.-Col. Stanislaus Julian Ostrorog, Royal Artillery
Maj. Harold Parker, North Lancashire Regiment
Maj. David Paterson, Royal Field Artillery
Temp Capt. Geoffrey Peireon  
Capt. Harold Peploe, Royal West Kent Regiment
Capt. Edward Phillips  Royal Army Medical Corps
Maj. Charles Edward Pierson, Royal Field Artillery
Lt.-Col. and Bt. Col. James Hawkins-Whitshed Pollard  Royal Scots Fusiliers
Maj. Hugh Alexander Pollock, Royal Scots Fusiliers
Lt.-Col. Gerald Robert Poole  Royal Marine Artillery
Temp Capt. Norman Porteous  Royal Engineers
Capt. Brian Bevil Quiller-Couch  Royal Field Artillery
Maj. George Bantham Leathart Rae, Liverpool Regiment, attd. Manchester Regiment
Capt. Wilfred Taunton Raikes  South Wales Borderers,  Machine Gun Corps
Maj. Richard Montague Raynsford, Leinster Regiment, attd. Connaught Rangers
Lt. Hugh Stanley Read  London Regiment
Maj. Alexander Kirkwood Reid  Highland Light Infantry
Lt. Norman Reid  Royal Field Artillery
Temp Maj. William. Brown Rennie  
Maj. Alan Boyd Reynolds, 12th Lancers,  Northumberland Hussars Yeomanry
Maj. Cyril Herbert Reynolds  Royal Garrison Artillery
Capt. Collen Edward Melville Richards  East Lancashire Regiment, attd. Middlesex Regiment
Temp Maj. Adolphus Noah Richardson  Machine Gun Corps
Maj. Frederick William Richey, Royal Garrison Artillery
Capt. Thomas Ridgway  South Lancashire Regiment
Capt. Reginald Harday Ridler, London Regiment, attd. Somerset Light Infantry
Temp Lt.-Col. Thomas Purvis Ritzema, Royal Field Artillery
Capt. Brian Hubert Robertson  Royal Engineers
Lt. James. Albert Roddick  Liverpool Regiment, attd. West Riding Regiment
Temp Maj. Harry Percival Rogers, Royal Fusiliers
Temp Capt. Robson Wilson Rotherford  
Lt. Gilbert Rowan  Royal Highlanders
Maj. William Orpen Sikottowe Sanders, Royal Garrison Artillery
Maj. Gilbert Ayshford Sanford, 20th Hussars
Maj. Alfred Carlisle Sayer  Sussex Yeomanry, attd. Royal Sussex Regiment
Maj. John Scott, Royal Field Artillery
Capt. Geofrey Lynton Sharpe, West Riding Regiment, attd. Army Cyclist Corps
Maj. Arthur Llewellyn Bancroft Shaw, Lancashire Fusiliers
Lt. John James Sheppard  London Regiment
Capt. Sydney Smith  Royal Field Artillery
Temp Capt. William Smyth  Royal Engineers
Capt. Arthur Herbert Tennyson, Lord Somers  1st Life Guards
Temp Lt. Herbert Somerville-Smith  Royal Field Artillery
Capt. Ernest Sopper  17th Lancers, attd. Leicestershire Regiment
Capt. Cecil Alleyn Thomas Spong, Royal Garrison Artillery
Lt. Arthur Warner Stanford  Royal Field Artillery
Temp Maj. William Scott Stevenson 
Capt. Robert Graham William Hawkins Stone  Royal Engineers
Maj. Francis Gerald Strange, Berkshire Yeomanry
Capt. Humphrey Cecil Travell Stronge  East Kent Regiment
Lt. Bill Stuart, Royal Field Artillery
Capt. John William Cotter Stubbs  Royal Army Medical Corps
Temp Maj. Frederick Summers  Royal Engineers
Temp Maj. Hector William Sutherland, King's Own Scottish Borderers
Temp Maj. George Vere Taylor  Rifle Brigade
Brig.-Maj. Leonard Mainwaring Taylor  Yorkshire Light Infantry
Maj. The Hon, Eric Richard Thesiger, Surrey Yeomanry
Capt. David Thomson  Royal Field Artillery
Maj. Edward Lionel Thomson, York and Lancaster Regiment
Maj. James Noel Thomson  Royal Field Artillery
Maj. John Ferguson Thomson, North Staffordshire Regiment
Lt.-Col. William Thorburn, Royal Scots
Capt. Justice Crosland Tilly  West Yorkshire Regiment,  Tank Corps
Capt. Robert Hill Tolerton  London Regiment
Capt. the Hon Denis Plantagenet Tolleanache, 7th Hussars
Capt. and Bt. Maj. Edward Devereux Hamilton Tollemache  Coldstream Guards
Lt. Frederick Georgei Tollworthy  London Regiment
Lt.-Col. George Alexander Trent  Northamptonshire Regiment
Capt. Alexander James Trousdell  Royal Irish Fusiliers
Maj. George Frederic Brown Turner, Royal Field Artillery
Maj. Harold Northcote Vinen, Gloucestershire Regiment
Capt. Montagu George Edward Walker, Royal Artillery
Maj. Charles Talbot Joseph Gerard Walmesley  Berkshire Yeomanry
Capt. Charles Herbert Walsh  Connaught Rangers
Maj. Evan Bernard Ward, Duke of Cornwall's Light Infantry
Capt. Robert Ogier Ward, Honourable Artillery Company
Maj. Kenneth Charles Harman Warner, York and Lancaster Regiment
Temp Capt. Aubrey Wentworth Harrison Watson  late King's Royal Rifle Corps
Capt. Robert Albert Watson  Royal Garrison Artillery
Temp Maj. William Henry Lowe Watson  Tank Corps
Capt. Leslie Ferguson Kennedy Way, Royal Army Medical Corps
Maj. Ernest Steuart Weldon, Dorsetshire Regiment
Capt. Stewart Montagu De Heriz Whatton  Royal Field Artillery
Temp Lt. Herbert White  Royal Irish Rifles
Capt. Robert Whyte  London Regiment
Lt. Thomas Glyndwr William  Liverpool Regiment, attd. North Lancashire Regiment
Temp Maj. Edward Bernard Wilson, Yorkshire Light Infantry, attd. London Regiment
Capt. Thomas Needham Furnival Wilson  King's Royal Rifle Corps
Capt. Frank Hole Witts  Irish Guards
Maj. John Burrell Holme Woodcock, Pembroke Yeomanry, attd. Welsh Regiment
Lt. Arthur James Wright  Northamptonshire Regiment
Temp Capt. Robert Yates  Royal Engineers

Canadian Forces
Maj. Stuart Douglas Armour, British Columbia Regiment
Maj. Louis William Barker, Canadian Garr. Artillery
Lt.-Col. Walker Bell, Royal Canadian Dragoons, attd. Tank Corps
Maj. Walter Edward Blue, Canadian Field Artillery
Lt.-Col. John Laurance Haslett Bogart, Canadian Engineers
Maj. Frank Lorn Campbell Bond, Canadian Railway Troops
Maj. Frederick Freer Brock, Canadian Heavy Artillery, attd. Royal Garrison Artillery
Maj. George Sackville Browne, Canadian Field Artillery
Lt.-Col. Alexander Douglas Cameron  Lord Strathcona's Horse, attd. Canadian Infantry, Eastern Ontario Regiment
Maj. Robert Stewart Carter, Canadian Railway Troops
Maj. Allen Hughes Charles, Quebec Regiment
Maj. Cyril William Upton Chivers  Canadian Engineers
Maj. Clifford Earl Churchill, Canadian Field Artillery
Maj. Percy Edward Colman  Canadian Mounted Rifles, Saskatchewan Regiment
Lt.-Col. Richard Costigan, Canadian Field Artillery
Maj. Henry William Darling Cos, Alberta Regiment, attd. East Lancashire Regiment 
Maj. Charles Stuart. Craig  Canadian Field Artillery
Maj. William Alexander De Grayes, Canadian Army Service Corps
Lt.-Col. Marie Joseph Romeo Henri Desrosiers, Canadian Infantry, Quebec Regiment
Maj. Adelbertl Augustus Durkee, Canadian Field Artillery
Temp Maj. Wesley John Eveleigh, Canadian Infantry, Alberta Regiment
Maj. Robert Walter Fiske, Canadian Infantry, Manitoba Regiment
Maj. John McIntyre Gibson, Canadian Railway Troops
Maj. Beaumont Andrew Gordon, Canadian Engineers
Maj. James Emanuel Hahn  Western Ontario Regiment
Maj. Patterson Lindsay Hall  Canadian Infantry, Quebec Regiment
Maj. Ralph Price Harding  Canadian Field Artillery
Maj. Richard Henry Moore Hardisty  Canadian Army Medical Corps
Col. Henry Thoresby Hughes  Canadian Engineers
Maj. Cyrus Fiske Inches  Canadian Garr. Artillery
Maj. James Colin Kemp  Canadian Mounted Rifles, Quebec Regiment
Maj. Andrew Robert Ketterson, Canadian Railway Troops
Maj. Charles Clinton Leader, Canadian Railway Troops
Lt.-Col. Ronald Hugh Macdonald  Canadian Army Medical Corps
Maj. Kenneth Plumb Macpherson, Canadian Engineers
Maj. Oliver Mowat Maitland, Saskatchewan Regiment, attd. Canadian Engineers
Maj. Frank Stanton Mathewson, Canadian Infantry, Quebec Regiment
Maj. Joseph Edward McCorkell, Canadian Machine Gun Corps
Maj. James McGregor, Canadian Railway Troops
Maj. Arthur Leonard Mieville  Canadian Engineers
Maj. Rene Martin Redmond, Quebec Regiment
Maj. Samuel Robson, Canadian Field Artillery, attd. 5th Canadian Div. Artillery
Maj. Thomas Escott Ryder  Canadian Garr. Artillery
Maj. James Austin Scroggie  Canadian Infantry, Manitoba Regiment
Maj. Ernest Raymond Selby, Canadian Army Medical Corps
Maj. Leonard Ernest Silcox, Canadian Railway Troops
Lt.-Col. Sanford Fleming Smith, Canadian Light Horse
Capt. Hugh Macdonald Wallis, Quebec Regiment
Maj. James Alexander Gordon White  Canadian Engineers
Capt. Ralph Willcock  Canadian Infantry, Quebec Regiment
Maj. John Douglas Young  Canadian Infantry, Manitoba Regiment
Capt. Lewis Younger  Alberta Regiment

Australian Imperial Force
Lt.-Col. William Llewellyn Arrell, Australian Infantry
Maj. William Alan Audsley, Australia Field Artillery
Maj. Duncan Beith, Australian Infantry
Col. Henry Gordon Bennett  3rd Australian Infantry Brigade
Col. James Harold Cannan  11th Australian Infantry Brigade
Maj. John Austin Chapman, Australian Infantry
Quartermaster and Hon Maj. John Duffy, 13th Australia Lt. Horse Regiment
Capt. Herbert Roy Gollan  Australian Infantry
Maj. Francis George Grant, Australian Infantry
Lt.-Col. John Herbert Hurst, 36th Australia Heavy Artillery Brigade
Lt.-Col. Hugh Bennett Lowers  Australian Army Medical Corps
Maj. Alexander. Mitchell, 13th Australia Light Horse Regiment
Maj. Basil Moorhouse Morris, 14th Brigade, Australia Field Artillery
Maj. John Robb Muirhead, Australia Army Medical Corps
Maj. Edward Joseph Parks  Australian Infantry
Lt.-Col. Alexander Thomas Paterson  Australian Infantry
Lt.-Col. Rupert Markham Sadler  Australian Infantry
Maj. Edward Kenneth Smart  10th Brigade, Australia Field Artillery
Maj. Marcus Vicars Southey, Australia Army Medical Corps
Lt.-Col. Clive Wentworth Thompson, Australia Army Medical Corps
Maj. William Tomkinson, Australia Field Artillery
Lt.-Col. Frank Couper Wooster, Australian Army Medical Corps

New Zealand Forces
Lt.-Col. Rawdon St. John Beere, NZ Rifle Brigade
Maj. Philip John Jory  NZ Army Medical Corps
Maj. Alexander Allan MacNab, NZ Rifle Brigade
Lt.-Col. Robert Stirrat McQuarrie  NZ Field Artillery
Lt.-Col. Owen Herbert Mead, Canterbury Regiment
Maj. Erima Harvey Northcroft, NZ Field Artillery
Maj. Alan Bernard Williams, NZ Field Artillery

South African Forces
Maj. Clifford Percy Ward, SA Horse Artillery, attd. Royal Garrison Artillery

For distinguished service in connection with military operations in Italy —
Maj. William, Bradley Gosset Barne, Royal Garrison Artillery
Temp Maj. Henry James Brooks  
Capt. John Risdon Murdock Crawford  Royal Engineers
Capt. Lawrence Francis Garratt  Royal Garrison Artillery
Capt. William Gordon  Gordon Highlanders
Lt. Albert Hoare  Royal Garrison Artillery
Capt. and Bt. Maj. Edward Lafone Graham Lawrence  Worcestershire Regiment
Temp Maj. Philip Lionel Lincoln  Northumberland Fusiliers
Capt. and Bt. Maj. George Humphrey Maurice, Lindsay, King's Own Scottish Borderers
Maj. Wilfrid Humphrey Mosley  Wiltshire Regiment
Capt. Charles Joseph O'Reilly  Royal Army Medical Corps
Capt. James Gray Simpson  Cameron Highlanders
Temp Capt. Allen Edgar Thompson  Royal Army Medical Corps
Capt. Edmund Wayne Vaughan  Royal Army Medical Corps
Temp Maj. Edward Viner, Manchester Regiment
Capt. Philip Lowndes Wright  Oxfordshire and Buckinghamshire Light Infantry
Col. Charles Stuart Wilson  late Royal Engineers

For distinguished services rendered in connection with military operations in Mesopotamia —
Lt.-Col. Frederick Arthur Frazer, Royal West Kent Regiment
Capt. Edward William Charles Noel  Indian Army, attd. Political Department
Maj. and Bt. Lt.-Col. Digby Inglis Shuttleworth, 3rd Gurkha Rifles, Indian Army

Awarded a Bar to the Distinguished Service Order (DSO*)
In recognition of distinguished services rendered during the war —
Lt.-Col. Frederick William Bowhill 

For distinguished service in connection with military operations in France and Flanders—
Temp Maj. William Veasey Franklin  South Wales Borderers, attd. Worcestershire Regiment
Lt.-Col. John Murray  Scottish Horse Yeomanry, attd. Royal Scots

Canadian Forces
Maj. Harold Murchison Savage  Canadian Field Artillery

For distinguished service in connection with military operations in Italy —
Capt., and Bt. Maj. William Charles Coleman Gell 
Capt. and Bt. Maj. Walter Marlborough Pryor  Hertfordshire Regiment

Distinguished Service Cross (DSC)

Military Cross (MC)

Distinguished Flying Cross (DFC)

Lt. Arthur Hugh Alban Alban, Royal Field Artillery
Lt. Fred Hubert Baguley
Maj. Cecil Baker, Australian Flying Corps
Lt. James Montemerli Batting
Lt. Edward Balfour Somerset Beaton, Australian Flying Corps
Lt. Victor Beecroft
Lt. Arthur Leslie Brice Bennett, Hampshire Regiment
Capt. Norman Arthur Bolton, Royal Field Artillery
2nd Lt. Percy Boulton
Capt. Geoffrey Hilton Bowman  Royal Warwickshire Regiment
Lt. Cecil Alchin Bridgland, East Surrey Regiment
2nd Lt. Henry Peareth Brumell
2nd Lt. Douglas Scott Carrie
2nd Lt. William Alexander Carrothers, Canadian Infantry
Lt. Hugh Campbell Chambers
Lt. Alfred Edward Chittenden
2nd Lt. William Coker, East Surrey Regiment
Lt. Harry Neville Compton
Capt. Arthur Coningham 
2nd Lt. Irving Banfield Corey
2nd Lt. Reginald Cyril Creamer
Lt. Charles William Cudemore 
Lt. Donald Brodby Gumming, Indian Army Reserve of Officers
Lt. John Cunliffe
Lt. Ernest Edgar Davies, Australian Flying Corps
Lt. William Henry Demel, Manchester Regiment
2nd Lt. James Carlos Deremo
Lt. James Henry Dewhurst
2nd Lt. Clennel Haggerston Picking, Canadian Infantry
Capt. Thomas Malcolm Dickinson
Lt. Norman Stuart Dougall, Lincolnshire Regiment
2nd Lt. George Emerson Dowler
Lt. Stanley Lorne Dowsell, Canadian Infantry
Lt. John Edgcumbe Doyle
Lt. Arthur Thomas Drinkwater
Lt. Lancelot de Saumarez Duke, Canadian Infantry
Lt. Duncan Campbell Dunlop
2nd Lt. Arthur Cyril Dutton, Royal West Kent Regiment
Lt. Cecil Stewart Emden, Royal West Kent Regiment
Lt. Preston Anthony Augustus Enright
Lt. Ray Templar Fagan
Capt. Cecil Fawssett, Royal Sussex Regiment
Lt. Hedley Ford, Northumberland Fusiliers
Lt. Spencer George Ford
Lt. James Walker Foreman
Lt. William Tom Fraser, Royal Field Artillery
Capt. William Cecil Gage
Capt. Ewart James Garland
Maj. Alfred Guy Rowland Garrod  Leicestershire Regiment
2nd Lt. Arthur James Gareide
Lt. Frank George Gibbons
Lt. Herbert Melhuish Golding
2nd Lt. Frederick Stanley Gordon
Lt. Reginald John Patrick Grebby
Lt. Jack Courtenay Green
Lt. Richard Grice
Lt. Ernest Alexander Devlin Hamilton, Australian Flying Corps
2nd Lt. Edgar Cyril Harris, King's Royal Rifle Corps
Capt. Gilbert James Barter
Lt. Frederick Cecil Hawley, Australian Flying Corps
Lt. George Rensbury Hicks
Lt. James Cyril Holmes
Lt. John Albert Hoogte
Lt. Geoffrey Herbert Hooper  Royal Engineers
Lt. George Vivian Howard
Capt. Owen Hughes
Lt. William Jack
Lt. Norman Hugh Jenkins 
Lt. Francis Richard Johnson
2nd Lt. Paul Alan Hastings King
Lt. Orville Lamplough, Australian Flying Corps
Lt. John Henry Latchford
Capt. Walter Brogden Lawson
Capt. Cyril Mountain Leman 
Lt. William Kerr Robertson Liddell, Highland Light Infantry
Lt. William Schuyler Lighthall, Dorsetshire Regiment
Lt. Humphrey Norman Lock, Indian Army
Lt. Alan Rodman McAfee
Lt. Godfrey Newman McBlain
Lt. Frank Stephenson McClurg
Lt. Archibald Duncan MacDonald, 42nd Squadron, Canadian Engineers
Lt. Eric Norman MacDonald
Lt. Norman Sinclair MacGregor
Lt. William John MacKenzie
Capt. Gyles Mackrell
2nd Lt. Hugh McLean
Lt. Malcolm Flaw MacLeod
Lt. Charles Edmund Maitland, Royal Garrison Artillery
2nd Lt. Cecil Montgomery Moore
2nd Lt. John Richard Moorhouse
Lt. Arthur William Murphy, Australian Flying Corps
2nd Lt. Cecil Walter Murray, Glasgow Yeomanry
Lt. Frank Noble
Lt. Harold Anthony Oaks
Lt. Godfrey Cathbar O'Donnell
Lt. John Emile Alexander O'Dwyer, Nottinghamshire and Derbyshire Regiment
Lt. Kenneth John Oldfield
Capt. Keith Rodney Park  Royal Field Artillery
Lt. Lawrence Fleming Pendred
2nd Lt. Albert Rennie Pengilly
Lt. Arthur Pickin
Lt. George Albert Pitt
2nd Lt. Horace Augustus Porter, Royal Garrison Artillery
Lt. Hugh Victor Puckridge, Shropshire Light Infantry
2nd Lt. Henry Robert Albert Victor Puncher
Lt. Thomas Gillies Rae
Capt. William Ronald Read  Dragoon Guards
Lt. Thomas Roberts
Lt. Francis Ernest Robinson
2nd Lt. Albert Rogerson
Lt. Hector Ross, Australian Flying Corps
Lt.-Col. Francis Maude Roxby  North Staffordshire Regiment
Lt. Frederick Stratton Russell 
2nd Lt. Richard Russell
Lt. Henry Peters Schoeman
2nd Lt. Francis William Seed
Lt. Reginald Albert Skelton
Lt. Charles Cuthbert Snow
2nd Lt. Richard Stafford-Langan, Leinster Regiment
Lt. Eric John Stephens
Lt. Frederick Joseph Stevenson
2nd Lt. Henry Walter Stockdale
Lt. John Arthur Stronach
Lt. Claude Somerset Style
2nd Lt. John Francis Dymore Tanqueray
Lt. Robert Arthur Thomas, Royal Welsh Fusiliers
2nd Lt. Frederick Thomasson
Lt. Frederick Oswell Thornton
Lt. Ulric Geoffrey Aldam Tonge
Lt. Sydney Edward Toomer, Royal Garrison Artillery
Lt. George Roulston Travis. 
Lt. Norman Charles Trescowthick, Australian Flying Corps
2nd Lt. John Turner
Lt. Edward West Unmack
Lt. Charles Lionel Veitch, North Lancashire Regiment
Lt. Ignatius Welby 
Lt. James Joseph Wellwood, Australian Flying Corps
Lt. Harold Albert White
Capt. Thomas Walter White, Australian Flying Corps
Lt. Paul Wilkins  Royal Engineers
Lt. Beresford Cooper Webb Windle
Lt. Erroll Holdsworth Williams
2nd Lt. Henry Cawling Wood
Lt. Frank Woolley
Capt. John William Wright, Australian Flying Corps
Capt. Henry Neilson Wrigley, Australian Flying Corps

Awarded a Bar to the Distinguished Flying Cross (DFC*) 
Lt. Edgar Oxenham Amm 
Capt. Rupert Norman Gould Atkinson 
2nd Lt. Edgar George Davies 
Lt. Duncan Grinnell-Milne  Royal Fusiliers
Lt. Malcolm Charles McGregor 
Capt. John William Finder 
Capt. William Dorian Thorn

Awarded a Second Bar to the Distinguished Flying Cross (DFC**) 
Lt. Walter Hunt Longton

Distinguished Flying Medal (DFM)

Awarded a Bar to the Distinguished Flying Medal (DFM*) 
Sergeant Mechanic James Chapman  (Newcastle upon Tyne)

Air Force Cross

Lt. Edward Melville Ackery
Lt. Cyril Leonard Adamson
Capt. Gordon Alchin, Royal Field Artillery
Lt. William Algie  Northumberland Fusiliers
Lt.-Col. Dermott Lang Allen, Royal Irish Fusiliers
Capt. Frank George Andreas
Lt. Harold Wright Arnott, Royal Engineers
Lt. Lionel Bayard Aylen
Capt. Lionel Mundy Bailey
Capt. Gilbert Barrett, Royal Engineers
Capt. Thomas Archibald Batchelor 
Capt. Frederic Alan Bates  Denbigh Yeomanry
Col. John Harold Whitworth Becke  Nottinghamshire and Derbyshire Regiment
Lt. Reginald John Bedlington Benson, Welsh Regiment
Capt. Harold John Thomas Berryman
Col. Arthur Wellesley Bigsworth 
Lt.-Col. Harold Blackburn 
Lt. Cecil William Blain
Capt. Ralph Sleigh Booth
Lt. William Thomas Breach, Army Service Corps
Lt. Henry George Samuel Broad
Capt. Herbert Stamford Broad
Lt. Douglas Charles Morris Brooks 
Capt. Leslie Oswald Brown  South Africa Artillery
Maj. Rolf Sanger Brown, Australian Flying Corps
Lt. Gerald Mornington Bryer
Lt. Vernon William Burgess, Australian Engineers
Maj. Albert James Butler  Royal Irish Rifles
Lt. William Bertram Callaway
Lt. Geoffrey Gordon Callender, Australian Defence Force
Capt. Cyril Wellesley Carleton, SA Defence Force
Lt.-Col. George Ivan Carmichael  Royal Field Artillery
Lt. Edgar Theodore Carpenter, Warwickshire Yeomanry
Capt. Alexander William Cassy
Capt. Thomas Charles Chamberlain, Middlesex Regiment
Lt.-Col. Ennis Tristram Ratcliffe Chambers
Lt. Lloyd Patterson Chase, Australian Flying Corps
Lt. Frederick Walter Clark
Maj. Edward Eric Clarke, York and Lancaster Regiment
Capt. George Malcolm Clarke, Leinster Regiment
Lt. Leslie Clarke, Manchester Regiment
Capt. Geoffrey Ernest Clinton, London Scots
Capt. Dirk Cloete 
Capt. Roger Bark Corfield
Maj. Geoffrey Henry Cox, North Staffordshire Regiment
Lt. William Reseigh Cox  Duke of Cornwall's Light Infantry
Capt. Horace Evelyn Craufurd
Capt. George Mitchell Croil, Gordon Highlanders
Lt. Hector Daniel 
Capt. Rhys Davies
Maj. Horace Gordon Dean, York and Lancaster Regiment
Capt. Dennis Milner Deighton
Capt. John Roland Secretan Devlin 
Maj. Bruno Philip Henry De Roeper
Capt. Norman Hereford Dimmock
Lt. Noel Parker Dixon
Lt. Ralph Melville Dixon, 9th Berks
Lt. Harold Hunter Down, Artists Rifles
Lt. Stanley Ethelbert Dreschfeld
Lt. Donald Herbert Drew
Lt. John Drew
Capt. Herbert Frank Stacey Drewitt  NZ Forces
Capt. Allan Duguid, Royal Field Artillery
Capt. Albert Durston
Maj. Tom Harry England 
Maj. Douglas Claude Strathearn Evill 
Lt. Robert Thornton Eyre
Capt. Albert Baird Fanstone
Lt. Gerald William Ferguson  Royal Army Service Corps
Maj. Frederick Bernard Fowler
Lt. Gordon James Fowler
2nd Lt. Hugh Arthur Francis
Capt. Austin Frauenfelder
Capt. Matthew Brown Frew  Highland Light Infantry
Capt. Philip Fletcher Fullard  Royal Irish Fusiliers
Capt. Arthur Noel Gallehawk
Lt. Frank George Garratt
Capt. Philip Clarke Garratt
Capt. Charles Leonard Elliot Geach, Dragoon Guards
Lt. Thomas Gilbert, Indian Army Reserve of Officers
Lt. John Lord Stuart Gill
Lt.-Col. Stuart Grant-Dalton  Yorkshire Regiment
Lt.-Col. John Crosby Halahan  Royal Dublin Fusiliers
2nd Lt. Edward Hall, York and Lancaster Regiment
Lt. Henry Hamer
Capt. William Andrew Hannay, Liverpool Regiment
Lt. David Allen Harding
Maj. Sydney Herbert Bywater Harris, King Edward's Horse
Capt. Bernard Edward Harrison
2nd Lt. Robert Lionel Hartley
Lt. Frederick William Hartridge, Royal Army Service Corps
Lt. Gerald Harwood, Essex Regiment
Lt. Herbert Richard Hastings
Capt. William Lionel Hay
Lt. Albert Ernest Hedges, York and Lancaster Regiment
Maj. George Lockhart Piercy Henderson  Royal Engineers
Lt. John Bodkin Henry, Royal Inniskilling Fusiliers
Capt. William Valentine Herbert, Australian Flying Corps
Lt.-Col. William Charles Hicks
Maj.-Gen. John Frederick Andrews Higgins 
Lt. D'Arcy Fowlis Hilton 
Lt. Arthur Hyde Hinton, Canadian Field Artillery
Lt. George Stacey Hodson
Capt. Leslie Hubert Holden  Australian Flying Corps
Capt. Fred Parkinson Holliday  Canadian Engineers
Capt. Henry Taylor Horsfield, Worcestershire Regiment
Lt. Reginald Thomas Brooke Houghton, Northamptonshire Regiment
Capt. Geoffrey Forrest Hughes  Australian Infantry
Capt. Robert Edward Aylmer Werge Hughes-Chamberlain
Lt. Charles Albert Hyde, Royal Fusiliers
Capt. Herbert Carrnichael Irwin
Lt. John Henry Jennings, Royal Army Service Corps
Capt. Montagu Righton Nevill Jennings 
Capt. Cedric Neville Jones, Nottinghamshire and Derbyshire Regiment 
Capt. Ignatius George Kelly
Capt. Neville Kemsley
Capt. James Kerr, Gordon Highlanders
Lt. Stewart Gordon Knock, Seaforth Highlanders
Lt. Charles McMenamen Laing  Royal Scots Fusiliers
Capt. Frederick Charles Lander
Maj. Ralph Towlerton Leather, Warwickshire Yeomanry
Lt.-Col. Charles Frederick Lee  King's Royal Rifle Corps
Lt. Archie Mansel Lewis, Royal Garrison Artillery
Capt. George Lawrence Lloyd  Staffordshire Yeomanry
Lt. Norman Baillie Lovemore
Capt. Richard Spencer Lucy, Worcestershire Regiment
Lt. George John Lusted
Lt. Harold Thomas Lydford
Capt. William Robert Brown McBain  Royal Field Artillery
Capt. Angus James Hugh MacColl
Capt. William Herbert Mackenzie
Capt. Norman MacMillan  Highland Light Infantry
Lt. Ronald Innes Macpherson, Dorsetshire Regiment
Lt. Stewart Earl Mailer, Australian Infantry
Capt. Garnet Francis Malley  Australian Flying Corps
Maj. Paul Copeland Maltby  Royal Welsh Fusiliers
Capt. Arthur Mann  Royal Army Service Corps
Lt. Gilbert Henry Martingell
Capt. George Campbell Matthews, Australian Flying Corps
Capt. Gerald Joseph Constable Maxwell  Lovat's Scouts
Capt. Faster Herbert Martin Maynard
Capt. Henry Meintjes  SA Forces
Capt. Francis John Williamson Mellersh
Lt. Charles Warburton Meredith, SA Engineers
Capt. Alfred Lewis Messenger
Lt. Norman Craig Millman  Canadian Engineers
Lt.-Col. Reginald Percy Mills  Royal Fusiliers
Maj. Geoffrey Arthur Nevett Mitchell, Royal Fusiliers
Lt.-Col. William Gore Sutherland Mitchell  Highland Light Infantry
Lt. Sydney James Moir, Australian Flying Corps
Capt. Harold Henry de Baillou Monk  King's Royal Rifle Corps
Maj. Alan Mushet Morison
Capt. Cecil Charles Morley
Lt. Frank William Morter, Royal Warwickshire Regiment
Capt. Denis Osmond Mulholland, Connaught Rangers
Capt. Malcolm Dent Nares
Lt. Oswald Stuart Neill
Capt. Gilbert Dirk Nelson 
Maj. Charles Henry Nicholas, South Wales Borderers
Capt. Jack Noakes 
Maj. Maurice Waldegrave Noel, Liverpool Regiment
Lt. Geoffrey Stewart O'Brian
Lt. Henry Duniboyne O'Neill, Royal Dublin Fusiliers
Capt. John Overton Cone Orton  Norfolk Regiment
Lt. George Sholto-Douglas Macfarlane Pape
Lt. Ralph Stuart Park
Lt. Joseph Albert Paul, Canadian Engineers
Capt. Lionel Guy Stanhope Payne  Suffolk Regiment
Lt. Albert Groundes Peace, Canadian Infantry
Lt. Arthur John Douglas Peebles, London Regiment
Lt. Francis Brian Percy
Lt. Maurice Walter Piercey
Lt. Christopher Pilkangton, Shropshire Light Infantry
Lt.-Col. Charles Frederick Pollock 
Lt. Stanley Howard Preston
Maj. Edward Radcliffe Pretyman, Somerset Light Infantry
Lt. Frederick Horace Prime, Canadian Infantry
Lt.-Col. Cuthbert Euan Charles Rabagliat  Yorkshire Light Infantry
2nd Lt. Leslie Thomas McKay Lawler Ray, Australian Flying Corps
Lt. Alexander Daniel Redd
Capt. Charles Ellison Rich
Capt. Alan Inicell Riley, Artists Regiment
Capt. Harold Jace Roach
Lt.-Col. Reginald Mandeville Rodwell, West Yorkshire Regiment
Lt. Alfred Douglas Rogers
Lt.-Col. Robert Peel Ross 
Lt. Herbert Bainbridge Russell, Royal Field Artillery
Lt. Wilfred Lloyd Rutledge  Canadian Infantry
Lt. Denis Charles William Sanders, Royal Field Artillery
2nd Lt. Bertram Soovell
Lt. George Sewell, Lincolnshire Regiment
Lt. William Sharpe, Grenadier Guards
Lt. Frederick Hubert Guy Shepard
Capt. William Allen Shirlaw, Highland Light Infantry
Capt. Alexander Macdonald Shook 
Lt. Francis Dudley John Silwood
Capt. Lawrence Hay Thomas Sloan, Cameron Highlanders
Lt. Charles Geoffrey Harding Smith
Capt. Ross Macpherson Smith  Australian Flying Corps
Lt. Russell Nelson Smith
Capt. Sebastian Oxley Smith 
Capt. Douglas Stewart, Royal Garrison Artillery
Capt. Duncan Markham Stewart, Royal Scots
Lt. John Lawrence Stocks
Lt. Edward Albert Sullock, Liverpool Regiment
Lt. James Henry Richardson Sutherland 
Capt. Arthur Maxwell Swyny, Royal Irish Rifles
Lt. Robert Keith Tailyour, Royal Field Artillery
Capt. William Monsell Tait, Durham Light Infantry
Lt. Leslie Taylor
Capt. Malcolm Lincoln Taylor, Royal Engineers
Capt. George Thorn
Capt. Meredith Thomas, Welsh Regiment
Lt. James Arthur Thompson
Maj. Arthur Ashford Benjamin Thomson  Royal Warwickshire Regiment
Capt. Denzil Robert Thurstan
Capt. Aubrey Mansfield Tidey
Maj. Benjamin Travers
Lt. Charles Tindal Travers
Lt. Cyril Charles Teesdale Turner
Lt. Louis Martin Van Eyssen
Lt. Herbert Asher Vineberg
Capt. Lawrence James Wackett  Australian Flying Corps
Capt. Stanley Walker, Australian Flying Corps
Capt. William Hastings de Warrenne Waller
Maj. Richard Barrington Ward
Capt. Walter Kemeys Francis Goodall Warneford
Maj. Harold Edward Mostyn Watkins
Capt. Donald Watson, East Yorkshire Regiment
Lt. William Edward Watt, King Edward's Horse
Lt. Henry Seely Whitby
Lt. Archer Statham White
Lt. Clifford Arthur Bernard Bowman Wilcock, Royal West Surrey Regiment
Lt. Stephen Wilkinson
Lt.-Col. Hugh Alexander Williamson 
Lt. Charles Eardley Wilmot
Lt. George Hamilton Bracher Wilson  Royal Army Service Corps
Capt. Gordon Campbell Wilson  Australian Flying Corps
Capt. Thomas Ellames Withington, Oxfordshire and Buckinghamshire Light Infantry 
Lt. Frank Teesdale Woods, Northamptonshire Regiment
Lt. Felix St. John Woollard, East Kent Regiment
Lt. Arthur Banks Wright, Highland Light Infantry
Maj. Arthur Claud Wright
Lt. Francis Yorke-Smith

Meritorious Service Medal (MSM) 

For valuable services rendered within the Union of South Africa in connection with the War — 

Staff Sergeant H. T. Ash, Veteran Reserve
Sergeant Maj. H. C. Brockett, Veteran Reserve
Sergeant Maj. J. F. Chapman, SA Medical Corps
Company Sergeant Maj. C. Germon, SA Service Corps Motor Transport
Regimental Sergeant Maj. W. Hoy, S.A.M.R.
Staff Sergeant A. Jackson, SA Service Corps Motor Transport
Sergeant Maj. Instr. J. Lilly, South-West Africa Permanent Force
Sergeant Maj. Instr. E. W. Merret, South-West Africa Permanent Force
Company Sergeant Maj. E. R. Pooley, SA Medical Corps
Arm. Staff Sergeant H. Richardson, Permanent Force (Staff)
Sergeant Maj. Instr. S. C. Schoneveldt, South-West Africa Permanent Force
Staff Sergeant P. E. Twynham, SA Service Corps Motor Transport
Regimental Sergeant Maj. J. Windrum, Permanent Force (Staff)

For valuable services rendered in the Field in connection with the Campaign in German South-West Africa —
Sergeant T. V. Baragwanath, Hunt's Scouts, 5th Mounted Brigade, Northern Force
Private S. G. Inglesby, Hunt's Scouts, 5th Mounted Brigade, Northern Force
Private T. H. Stamp, Hunt's Scouts, 5th Mounted Brigade, Northern Force

Imperial Service Order (ISO)
Home Civil Service
James Bailey, Deputy Controller, Central, Telegraph Office, General Post Office
William Henry Eggett, Accountant, Colonial Office
William John Farrant, Clerk for Statistical Returns, Home Office
Arthur William King, Establishment Officer, Board of Education
Frank Minter, Chief Examiner of Assessment in the Office of the Special Commissioners of Income Tax
Arthur Neeves, Principal Clerk, Patent Office
Percy Ambrose Noble Nicholls, Acting Principal Clerk, Exchequer and Audit Department
Patrick O'Brien, Deputy Chief Inspector of Customs and Excise
Arthur Ventris Murphy Ventris, Superintendent of the Perth (Western Australia) Branch of the Royal Mint

Colonial Civil Service
William Ross Anderson, Secretary, Law Department, State of Victoria
Richard Gerald Anthonisz, Government Archivist and Librarian, Island of Ceylon
Thomas Duffield, Secretary to the Local Government Branch, Department of Lands, State of South Australia
Frank Henry French, Inspector, Royal North West Mounted Police, Dominion of Canada
Gascoigne Lumley, Chief Engineer, Marine Department, Nigeria
Herbert Millar, Registrar of Deeds, Province of Natal, Union of South Africa
Robert Clare Russell, late Superintendent of Stores and Shipping, Office of the High Commissioner in London for the Union of South Africa
William Stonham Short, Under Secretary, Public Works Department, Dominion of New Zealand
George E. Turner, Deputy Minister of Agriculture and Mines, Colony of Newfoundland
Wan Muhammad Isa bin Ibrahim, Orang Kay Mentri of Perak, Member of the State Council, Perak

Indian Civil Service
Henry Richard White, Staff Clerk, Accountant-General's Department
Honorary Maj. John Robertson, Indian Medical Department, in charge of Viceroys Dispensary. 
Diwan Bahadur Munshi Damodar Lai, Additional District and Sessions Judge, Ajmer-Merwara, Rajputana
William George Nicoll, Head Engineer, Bombay Mint
Khan Bahadur Saiyid Zakir Ali, Provincial Civil Service, Deputy Commissioner, Darnoh, Central Provinces
Charles William Moss, Head Master, Madrasa-i-Azam, Madras
Rai Bahadur Bhagavati Sahay, Inspector of Schools, Bhagalpur Division, Bihar and Orissa
Thomas Oronan, Personal Assistant to the Director, Telegraph Engineering, Northern Circle, Lahore, Punjab
Rao Bahadur Pandit Girdhari Lai, Provincial Civil Service, Extra Assistant Commissioner, Punjab
Reginald Cyril Savedra, Assistant, Criminal Investigation Department, Bengal
Raghuber Dial Mir Munsbi, Nepal Residency Office

Imperial Service Medal (ISM)

Batto Lai, late Compounder, Gadarwara, Narsinghpur District, Central Provinces

References

Birthday Honours
1919 awards
1919 in Australia
1919 in Canada
1919 in India
1919 in New Zealand
1919 in the United Kingdom